This is an incomplete list of Statutory Instruments of the United Kingdom in 2007.

1-100

 Cider and Perry and Wine and Made-wine (Amendment) Regulations 2007 (S.I. 2007/4)
 Customs and Excise (Personal Reliefs for Special Visitors) (Amendment) Order 2007 (S.I. 2007/5)
 Borough Council of Sandwell (Watery Lane Canal Bridge) Scheme 2003 Confirmation Instrument 2007 (S.I. 2007/11)
 Stamp Duty Reserve Tax (UK Depositary Interest in Foreign Securities) (Amendment) Regulations 2007 (S.I. 2007/12)
 Air Passenger Duty (Rate) (Qualifying Territories) Order 2007 (S.I. 2007/22)
 Education (School Improvement Partner) (England) Regulations 2007 (S.I. 2007/25)
 Income-related Benefits (Subsidy to Authorities) (Miscellaneous Amendments and Electronic Communications) Order 2007 (S.I. 2007/26)
 Air Navigation (Dangerous Goods) (Amendment) Regulations 2007 (S.I. 2007/28)
 Offshore Installations (Safety Zones) Order 2007 (S.I. 2007/41)
 Food Hygiene (England) (Amendment) Regulations 2007 (S.I. 2007/56)
 Children and Young People's Plan (England) (Amendment) Regulations 2007 (S.I. 2007/57)
 Road Tolling (Interoperability of Electronic Road User Charging and Road Tolling Systems) Regulations 2007 (S.I. 2007/58)
 Education (New Secondary School Proposals) (England) (Amendment) Regulations 2007 (S.I. 2007/59)
 Occupational and Personal Pension Schemes (Prescribed Bodies) Regulations 2007 (S.I. 2007/60)
 Protection of Wrecks (Designation) (England) Order 2007 (S.I. 2007/61)
 Railways Act 2005 (Commencement No. 8) Order 2007 (S.I. 2007/62)
 Joint Municipal Waste Management Strategies (Disapplication of Duties) (England) Regulations 2007 (S.I. 2007/63)
 Air Quality Standards Regulations 2007 (S.I. 2007/64)
 Wycombe (Parishes) Order 2007 (S.I. 2007/65)
 Violent Crime Reduction Act 2006 (Commencement No. 1) Order 2007 (S.I. 2007/74)
 Rural Development (Enforcement) (England) Regulations 2007 (S.I. 2007/75)
 Pensions Act 2004 (Code of Practice) (Modification of subsisting rights) Appointed Day Order 2007 (S.I. 2007/76)
 Offshore Petroleum Activities (Conservation of Habitats) (Amendment) Regulations 2007 (S.I. 2007/77)
 Sulphur Content of Liquid Fuels (England and Wales) Regulations 2007 (S.I. 2007/79)
 Claims Management Services Tribunal Rules 2007 (S.I. 2007/90)
 Northern Ireland (St Andrews Agreement) Act 2006 (Commencement No.1) Order 2007 (S.I. 2007/92)
 Excepted Vehicles (Amendment of Schedule 1 to the Hydrocarbon Oil Duties Act 1979) Order 2007 (S.I. 2007/93)
 Compensation Act 2006 (Commencement No. 2) Order 2007 (S.I. 2007/94)
 Driving Licences (Exchangeable Licences) Order 2007 (S.I. 2007/95)
 Driving Licences (Exchangeable Licences) (Amendment) Order 2007 (S.I. 2007/96)

101-200

 School Admissions (Adjudicator Determinations Relating to Looked After and Certain Other Children) (England) Regulations 2007 (S.I. 2007/105)
 Dairy Produce Quotas (Amendment) Regulations 2007 (S.I. 2007/106)
 Assisted Areas Order 2007 (S.I. 2007/107)
 Financial Services (EEA State) Regulations 2007 (S.I. 2007/108)
 Civil Partnership (Employee Share Ownership Plans) Order 2007 (S.I. 2007/109)
 Work at Height (Amendment) Regulations 2007 (S.I. 2007/114)
 Personal Injuries (NHS Charges) (Amounts) Regulations 2007 (S.I. 2007/115)
 Food for Particular Nutritional Uses (Addition of Substances for Specific Nutritional Purposes) (Wales) (Amendment) Regulations 2007 (S.I. 2007/116)
 Statutory Nuisance (Miscellaneous Provisions) (Wales) Regulations 2007 (S.I. 2007/117)
 Social Security (Contributions) (Amendment) Regulations 2007 (S.I. 2007/118)
 Seed (Wales) (Amendments for Tests and Trials etc.) Regulations 2007 (S.I. 2007/119)
 Statutory Nuisances (Miscellaneous Provisions) (Wales) Order 2007 (S.I. 2007/120)
 National Health Service (Free Prescriptions and Charges for Drugs and Appliances) (Wales) Regulations 2007 (S.I. 2007/121)
 National Health Service (General Ophthalmic Services) (Amendment) (Wales) Regulations 2007 (S.I. 2007/122)
 Consumer Credit Act 2006 (Commencement No. 2 and Transitional Provisions and Savings) Order 2007 (S.I. 2007/123)
 Uncertificated Securities (Amendment) Regulations 2007 (S.I. 2007/124)
 Financial Services and Markets Act 2000 (Exemption) (Amendment) Order 2007 (S.I. 2007/125)
 Financial Services and Markets Act 2000 (Markets in Financial Instruments) Regulations 2007 (S.I. 2007/126)
 Insolvency Practitioners and Insolvency Services Account (Fees) (Amendment) Order 2007 (S.I. 2007/133)
 District of South Northamptonshire (Electoral Changes) (Amendment) Order 2007 (S.I. 2007/137)
 Borough of Castle Morpeth (Electoral Changes) Order 2007 (S.I. 2007/138)
 Borough of Dacorum (Electoral Changes) Order 2007 (S.I. 2007/139)
 District of East Northamptonshire (Electoral Changes) Order 2007 (S.I. 2007/140)
 District of Mendip (Electoral Changes) Order 2007 (S.I. 2007/141)
 District of Newark and Sherwood (Electoral Changes) Order 2007 (S.I. 2007/142)
 District of North Wiltshire (Electoral Changes) Order 2007 (S.I. 2007/143)
 District of South Gloucestershire (Electoral Changes) Order 2007 (S.I. 2007/144)
 District of South Holland (Electoral Changes) Order 2007 (S.I. 2007/145)
 Borough of Taunton Deane (Electoral Changes) Order 2007 (S.I. 2007/146)
 District of Wansbeck (Electoral Changes) Order 2007 (S.I. 2007/148)
 Emergency Workers (Obstruction) Act 2006 (Commencement) Order 2007 (S.I. 2007/153)
 Valley Invicta Park Federation (School Governance) Order 2007 (S.I. 2007/167)
 Returning Officers (Parliamentary Constituencies) (Wales) Order 2007 (S.I. 2007/171)
 Education (Induction Arrangements for School Teachers) (Consolidation) (England) (Amendment) Regulations 2007 (S.I. 2007/172)
 Gambling Act 2005 (Proceedings of Licensing Committees and Sub-committees) (Premises Licences and Provisional Statements) (England and Wales) Regulations 2007 (S.I. 2007/173)
 Environmental Offences (Fixed Penalties) (Miscellaneous Provisions) Regulations 2007 (S.I. 2007/175)
 Education (Student Support) Regulations 2007 (S.I. 2007/176)
 M62 Motorway (Junction 6 Improvements) (Connecting Roads) Scheme 2007 (S.I. 2007/177)
 Notification of Marketing of Food for Particular Nutritional Uses (England) Regulations 2007 (S.I. 2007/181)
 Immigration, Asylum and Nationality Act 2006 (Commencement No. 4) Order 2007 (S.I. 2007/182)
 Quick-frozen Foodstuffs (England) Regulations 2007 (S.I. 2007/191)
 Education (Admission Forums) (England) (Amendment) Regulations 2007 (S.I. 2007/192)
 European Communities (Designation) Order 2007 (S.I. 2007/193)
 School Admissions (Co-ordination of Admission Arrangements) (England) Regulations 2007 (S.I. 2007/194)
 Education (Prohibition from Teaching or Working with Children) (Amendment) Regulations 2007 (S.I. 2007/195)
 Official Controls (Animals, Feed and Food) (Wales) Regulations 2007 (S.I. 2007/196)
 Day Care and Child Minding (Disqualification) (England) (Amendment) Regulations 2007 (S.I. 2007/197)

201-300

 Environmental Impact Assessment (Uncultivated Land and Semi-natural Areas) (Wales) (Amendment) Regulations 2007 (S.I. 2007/203)
 Health Act 2006 (Commencement No. 1 and Transitional Provisions) (Wales) Order 2007 (S.I. 2007/204)
 National Health Service (Miscellaneous Amendments Concerning Independent Nurse Prescribers, Supplementary Prescribers, Nurse Independent Prescribers and Pharmacist Independent Prescribers) (Wales) Regulations 2007 (S.I. 2007/205)
 Value Added Tax (Health and Welfare) Order 2007 (S.I. 2007/206)
 Terrorism Act 2000 (Business in the Regulated Sector) Order 2007 (S.I. 2007/207)
 Proceeds of Crime Act 2002 (Business in the Regulated Sector) Order 2007 (S.I. 2007/208)
 Compensation (Exemptions) Order 2007 (S.I. 2007/209)
 Contaminants in Food (England) Regulations 2007 (S.I. 2007/210)
 Tax Credits (Approval of Child Care Providers) (Wales) Scheme 2007 (S.I. 2007/226)
 Local Authorities (Alteration of Requisite Calculations) (England) Regulations 2007 (S.I. 2007/227)
 Local Government Pension Scheme (Amendment) Regulations 2007 (S.I. 2007/228)
 Electoral Administration Act 2006 (Commencement No. 3) Order 2007 (S.I. 2007/230)
 A1 Trunk Road (A151/B676 Junction and B6403 Junction Improvements Colsterworth) Order 2007 (S.I. 2007/231)
 A1 Trunk Road (A151/B676 Junction and B6403 Junction Improvements Colsterworth) (Detrunking) Order 2007 (S.I. 2007/232)
 A34 Trunk Road (Chieveley Interchange) (40 Miles Per Hour Speed Limit) Order 2007 (S.I. 2007/233)
 National Assembly for Wales (Representation of the People) Order 2007 (S.I. 2007/236)
 Road Safety Act 2006 (Commencement No. 1) Order 2007 (S.I. 2007/237)
 Copyright (Certification of Licensing Scheme for Educational Recording of Broadcasts) (Educational Recording Agency Limited) Order 2007 (S.I. 2007/266)
 Local Access Forums (England) Regulations 2007 (S.I. 2007/268)
 Gambling (Operating Licence and Single-Machine Permit Fees) (Amendment) Regulations 2007 (S.I. 2007/269)
 Parliamentary Pensions (Amendment) Regulations 2007 (S.I. 2007/270)
 Social Security Investigation Powers (Arrangements with Northern Ireland) Regulations 2007 (S.I. 2007/271)
 Broadcasting Act 1990 (Independent Radio Services Exceptions) Order 2007 (S.I. 2007/272)
 Copyright and Performances (Application to Other Countries) Order 2007 (S.I. 2007/273)
 Air Navigation (Amendment) Order 2007 (S.I. 2007/274)
 Transfer of Functions (Asylum Support Adjudicators) Order 2007 (S.I. 2007/275)
 Patents (Convention Countries) Order 2007 (S.I. 2007/276)
 Designs (Convention Countries) Order 2007 (S.I. 2007/277)
 Wireless Telegraphy (Isle of Man) Order 2007 (S.I. 2007/278)
 Science and Technology Facilities Council Order 2007 (S.I. 2007/279)
 Technology Strategy Board Order 2007 (S.I. 2007/280)
 Iran (Financial Sanctions) Order 2007 (S.I. 2007/281)
 Iran (United Nations Measures) (Overseas Territories) Order 2007 (S.I. 2007/282)
 Lebanon (United Nations Sanctions) (Overseas Territories) Order 2007 (S.I. 2007/283)
 Liberia (Restrictive Measures) (Overseas Territories) (Amendment) Order 2007 (S.I. 2007/284)
 Scottish Parliament (Disqualification) Order 2007 (S.I. 2007/285)
 Scotland Act 1998 (Agency Arrangements) (Specification) Order 2007 (S.I. 2007/286)
 Street Works (Amendment) (Northern Ireland) Order 2007 (S.I. 2007/287)
 Police and Criminal Evidence (Amendment) (Northern Ireland) Order 2007 (S.I. 2007/288)
 Pharmacists and Pharmacy Technicians Order 2007 (S.I. 2007/289)
 Petroleum Act 1998 (Third Party Access) Order 2007 (S.I. 2007/290)
 Guarantees of Origin of Electricity Produced from High-efficiency Cogeneration Regulations 2007 (S.I. 2007/292)
 Biocidal Products (Amendment) Regulations 2007 (S.I. 2007/293)
 Housing Benefit (Daily Liability Entitlement) Amendment Regulations 2007 (S.I. 2007/294)
 Plant Protection Products (Fees) Regulations 2007 (S.I. 2007/295)
 Sexual Offences Act 2003 (Amendment of Schedules 3 and 5) Order 2007 (S.I. 2007/296)

301-400

 Capital Allowances (Leases of Background Plant or Machinery for a Building) Order 2007 (S.I. 2007/303)
 Long Funding Leases (Elections) Regulations 2007 (S.I. 2007/304)
 Housing Act 2004 (Commencement No. 4) (Wales) Order 2007 (S.I. 2007/305)
 Highways Act 1980 (Gating Orders) (Wales) Regulations 2007 (S.I. 2007/306)
 Review of Children's Cases (Wales) Regulations 2007 (S.I. 2007/307)
 Northern Ireland Assembly (Elections) (Amendment) Order 2007 (S.I. 2007/308)
 Charities Act 2006 (Commencement No 1, Transitional Provisions and Savings) Order 2007 (S.I. 2007/309)
 Placement of Children (Wales) Regulations 2007 (S.I. 2007/310)
 Children's Homes (Wales) (Miscellaneous Amendments) Regulations 2007 (S.I. 2007/311)
 Decommissioning of Fishing Vessels Scheme 2007 (S.I. 2007/312)
 Value Added Tax (Amendment) Regulations 2007 (S.I. 2007/313)
 Fuel-testing Pilot Projects (Biomix Project) Regulations 2007 (S.I. 2007/314)
 Local Health Boards (Functions) (Wales) (Amendment) Regulations 2007 (S.I. 2007/315)
 Children's Commissioner for Wales (Amendment) Regulations 2007 (S.I. 2007/316)
 Immigration Services Commissioner (Designated Professional Body) (Fees) Order 2007 (S.I. 2007/317)
 Companies Acts (Unregistered Companies) Regulations 2007 (S.I. 2007/318)
 Gambling Act 2005 (Inspection) (Provision of Information) Regulations 2007 (S.I. 2007/319)
 Construction (Design and Management) Regulations 2007 (S.I. 2007/320)
 Greater London Authority (Allocation of Grants for Precept Calculations) Regulations 2007 (S.I. 2007/321)
 District of West Wiltshire (Electoral Changes) Order 2007 (S.I. 2007/323)
 Preston (Electoral Changes) Order 2007 (S.I. 2007/326)
 Food Supplements (England) (Amendment) Regulations 2007 (S.I. 2007/330)
 Chiltern (Parishes) Order 2007 (S.I. 2007/332)
 Basildon (Parishes) Order 2007 (S.I. 2007/333)
 Bedford (Parishes) Order 2007 (S.I. 2007/334)
 Aylesbury Vale (Parishes) Order 2007 (S.I. 2007/335)
 Test Valley (Parishes) Order 2007 (S.I. 2007/336)
 Traffic Management (Guidance on Intervention Criteria) (England) Order 2007 (S.I. 2007/339)
 M621 Motorway (Speed Limit) (Amendment) Regulations 2007 (S.I. 2007/349)
 Education (Budget Statements) (England) Regulations 2007 (S.I. 2007/356)
 Social Security (Recovery of Benefits) (Amendment) Regulations 2007 (S.I. 2007/357)
 Motor Vehicles (Type Approval for Goods Vehicles) (Great Britain) (Amendment) Regulations 2007 (S.I. 2007/361)
 School Finance (Amendment) (England) Regulations 2007 (S.I. 2007/365)
 Occupational Pension Schemes (Contracting-out) (Amount Required for Restoring State Scheme Rights) Amendment Regulations 2007 (S.I. 2007/366)
 Food Hygiene (Wales) (Amendment) Regulations 2007 (S.I. 2007/373)
 National Assembly for Wales (Date of First Meeting of the Assembly Constituted by the Government of Wales Act 2006) Order 2007 (S.I. 2007/374)
 Home Energy Efficiency Schemes (Wales) Regulations 2007 (S.I. 2007/375)
 Products of Animal Origin (Third Country Imports) (Wales) Regulations 2007 (S.I. 2007/376)
 Wireless Telegraphy (Licence Award) Regulations 2007 (S.I. 2007/378)
 Wireless Telegraphy (Limitation of Number of Spectrum Access Licences) Order 2007 (S.I. 2007/379)
 Wireless Telegraphy (Spectrum Trading) (Amendment) Regulations 2007 (S.I. 2007/380)
 Wireless Telegraphy (Register) (Amendment) Regulations 2007 (S.I. 2007/381)
 Financial Services and Markets Act 2000 (Ombudsman Scheme) (Consumer Credit Jurisdiction) Order 2007 (S.I. 2007/383)
 Housing (Right to Buy)(Service Charges) (Amendment)(England) Order 2007 (S.I. 2007/384)
 Local Government (Best Value Authorities) (Power to Trade) (England) (Amendment) Order 2007 (S.I. 2007/385)
 Dangerous Substances and Preparations (Safety) (Amendment) Regulations 2007 (S.I. 2007/386)
 Consumer Credit Act 2006 (Commencement No. 2 and Transitional Provisions and Savings) (Amendment) Order 2007 (S.I. 2007/387)
 Accounts and Audit (Wales) (Amendment) Regulations 2007 (S.I. 2007/388)
 Quick-frozen Foodstuffs (Wales) Regulations 2007 (S.I. 2007/389)
 Clean Neighbourhoods and Environment Act 2005 (Commencement No.4) (England) Order 2007 (S.I. 2007/390)
 Criminal Justice Act 2003 (Commencement No.8 and Transitional and Saving Provisions) (Amendment) Order 2007 (S.I. 2007/391)
 Wireless Telegraphy (Recognised Spectrum Access Charges) Regulations 2007 (S.I. 2007/392)
 Wireless Telegraphy (Recognised Spectrum Access) Regulations 2007 (S.I. 2007/393)
 Wireless Telegraphy (Limitation of Number of Grants of Recognised Spectrum Access) Order 2007 (S.I. 2007/394)
 Agricultural Wages Committee (Wales) Order 2007 (S.I. 2007/395)
 Commissioner for Older People in Wales (Appointment) Regulations 2007 (S.I. 2007/396)
 Local Authorities (Alternative Arrangements) (Wales) Regulations 2007 (S.I. 2007/397)
 Commissioner for Older People in Wales Regulations 2007 (S.I. 2007/398)
 Local Authorities (Executive Arrangements) (Functions and Responsibilities) (Wales) Regulations 2007 (S.I. 2007/399)
 Medical Devices (Amendment) Regulations 2007 (S.I. 2007/400)

401-500

 Gangmasters (Licensing Conditions) (No. 2) (Amendment) Rules 2007 (S.I. 2007/401)
 Welfare of Animals (Slaughter or Killing) (Amendment) (England) Regulations 2007 (S.I. 2007/402)
 Stockton-on-Tees (Parishes) Order 2007 (S.I. 2007/403)
 West Lancashire (Parish) Order 2007 (S.I. 2007/404)
 Poultry Breeding Flocks and Hatcheries (England) Order 2007 (S.I. 2007/405)
 Town and Country Planning (General Permitted Development) (Amendment) (England) Order 2007 (S.I. 2007/406)
 Environmental Noise (Identification of Noise Sources) (England) Regulations 2007 (S.I. 2007/415)
 Marriage Act 1949 (Remedial) Order 2007 (S.I. 2007/438)
 Royal Pharmaceutical Society of Great Britain (Registration Rules) Order of Council 2007 (S.I. 2007/441)
 Royal Pharmaceutical Society of Great Britain (Fitness to Practise and Disqualification etc. Rules) Order of Council 2007 (S.I. 2007/442)
 Adventure Activities Licensing (Amendment) Regulations 2007 (S.I. 2007/446)
 Adventure Activities (Licensing) (Designation) Order 2007 (S.I. 2007/447)
 Diseases of Animals (Approved Disinfectants) (England) Order 2007 (S.I. 2007/448)
 Colours in Food (Amendment) (England) Regulations 2007 (S.I. 2007/453)
 Gambling Act 2005 (Family Entertainment Centre Gaming Machine) (Permits) Regulations 2007 (S.I. 2007/454)
 Gambling Act 2005 (Prize Gaming) (Permits) Regulations 2007 (S.I. 2007/455)
 Commons Act 2006 (Commencement No. 2, Transitional Provisions and Savings) (England) Order 2007 (S.I. 2007/456)
 Commons (Registration of Town or Village Greens) (Interim Arrangements) (England) Regulations 2007 (S.I. 2007/457)
 Stamp Duty and Stamp Duty Reserve Tax (Extension of Exceptions relating to Recognised Exchanges) (Amendment) Regulations 2007 (S.I. 2007/458)
 Gambling Act 2005 (Premises Licences and Provisional Statements) Regulations 2007 (S.I. 2007/459)
 Office for Standards in Education, Children's Services and Skills (Children's Rights Director) Regulations 2007 (S.I. 2007/460)
 Competition Commission (Water Industry) Penalties Order 2007 (S.I. 2007/461)
 Education and Inspections Act 2006 (Inspection of Local Authorities) Regulations 2007 (S.I. 2007/462)
 Childcare Act 2006 (Childcare Assessments) Regulations 2007 (S.I. 2007/463)
 Education and Inspections Act 2006 (Prescribed Education and Training etc.) Regulations 2007 (S.I. 2007/464)
 Greenhouse Gas Emissions Trading Scheme (Amendment) Regulations 2007 (S.I. 2007/465)
 Road Safety Act 2006 (Commencement No. 1) (England and Wales) Order 2007 (S.I. 2007/466)
 Immigration, Asylum and Nationality Act 2006 (Commencement No. 5) Order 2007 (S.I. 2007/467)
 Vehicle and Operator Services Agency Trading Fund (Maximum Borrowing) Order 2007 (S.I. 2007/468)
 Accession (Immigration and Worker Authorisation) (Amendment) Regulations 2007 (S.I. 2007/475)
 Milk (Cessation of Production) (Revocation) Scheme 2007 (S.I. 2007/476)
 Dairy Produce (Miscellaneous Provisions) Regulations 2007 (S.I. 2007/477)
 NHS Direct National Health Service Trust (Establishment) Order 2007 (S.I. 2007/478)
 Gambling (Premises Licence Fees) (England and Wales) Regulations 2007 (S.I. 2007/479)
 Burnley (Parish Electoral Arrangements) Order 2007 (S.I. 2007/483)
 West Lancashire (Parish Electoral Arrangements and Electoral Changes) Order 2007 (S.I. 2007/489)
 Meat (Official Controls Charges) (England) Regulations 2007 (S.I. 2007/492)
 Tax and Civil Partnership Regulations 2007 (S.I. 2007/493)
 Registered Pension Schemes (Standard Lifetime and Annual Allowances) Order 2007 (S.I. 2007/494)
 Motor Vehicles (Approval) (Fees) (Amendment) Regulations 2007 (S.I. 2007/495)
 School Admissions (Alteration and Variation of, and Objections to, Arrangements) (England) Regulations 2007 (S.I. 2007/496)
 Education (Determination of Admission Arrangements) (Amendment) (England) Regulations 2007 (S.I. 2007/497)
 Road Vehicles (Registration and Licensing) (Amendment) Regulations 2007 (S.I. 2007/498)
 Animal Welfare Act 2006 (Commencement No. 1) (England) Order 2007 (S.I. 2007/499)
 Public Service Vehicles Accessibility (Amendment) Regulations 2007 (S.I. 2007/500)

501-600

 Council Tax and Non-Domestic Rating (Amendment) (England) Regulations 2007 (S.I. 2007/501)
 Public Service Vehicles (Conditions of Fitness, Equipment, Use and Certification) (Amendment) Regulations 2007 (S.I. 2007/502)
 Goods Vehicles (Plating and Testing) (Amendment) Regulations 2007 (S.I. 2007/503)
 NHS Direct Special Health Authority Abolition Order 2007 (S.I. 2007/504)
 Healthy Start Scheme and Welfare Food (Amendment) Regulations 2007 (S.I. 2007/505)
 Motor Vehicles (Tests) (Amendment) Regulations 2007 (S.I. 2007/506)
 Motor Cycles Etc. (Single Vehicle Approval) (Fees) (Amendment) Regulations 2007 (S.I. 2007/507)
 Insolvency Proceedings (Fees) (Amendment) Order 2007 (S.I. 2007/521)
 Enterprise Act 2002 (EEA State) (Amendment) Regulations 2007 (S.I. 2007/528)
 Cattle Identification Regulations 2007 (S.I. 2007/529)
 Climate Change and Sustainable Energy Act 2006 (Commencement) Order 2007 (S.I. 2007/538)
 National Lottery Act 2006 (Commencement No. 4) Order 2007 (S.I. 2007/539)
 Commons Registration (Objections and Maps) (Amendment) (England) Regulations 2007 (S.I. 2007/540)
 Social Security (Claims and Payments) Amendment Regulations 2007 (S.I. 2007/541)
 National Health Service (Optical Charges and Payments) Amendment Regulations 2007 (S.I. 2007/542)
 National Health Service (Charges for Drugs and Appliances) Amendment Regulations 2007 (S.I. 2007/543)
 National Health Service (Dental Charges, General Dental Services Contracts and Personal Dental Services Agreements) Amendment Regulations 2007 (S.I. 2007/544)
 Planning and Compulsory Purchase Act 2004 (Commencement No.4 and Consequential, Transitional and Savings Provisions) (Wales) (Amendment No.1) Order 2007 (S.I. 2007/546)
 Road Traffic (Permitted Parking Area and Special Parking Area) (Metropolitan Borough of Tameside) Order 2007 (S.I. 2007/547)
 Enduring Powers of Attorney (Prescribed Form) (Amendment) Amendment Regulations 2007 (S.I. 2007/548)
 Enduring Powers of Attorney (Welsh Language Prescribed Form) (Amendment) Regulations 2007 (S.I. 2007/549)
 Charities (Bridge House Estates) Order 2007 (S.I. 2007/550)
 Bus Lane Contraventions (Approved Local Authorities) (England) (Amendment) Order 2007 (S.I. 2007/551)
 Commission for Social Care Inspection (Fees and Frequency of Inspections) Regulations 2007 (S.I. 2007/556)
 Lewisham Primary Care Trust (Transfer of Trust Property) Order 2007 (S.I. 2007/557)
 National Health Service (Functions of Strategic Health Authorities and Primary Care Trusts and Administration Arrangements) (England) (Amendment) Regulations 2007 (S.I. 2007/559)
 Home Information Pack (Redress Scheme) Order 2007 (S.I. 2007/560)
 Royal Pharmaceutical Society of Great Britain (Fitness to Practise and Registration Appeals Committees and their Advisers Rules) Order of Council 2007 (S.I. 2007/561)
 Drugs Act 2005 (Commencement No. 5) Order 2007 (S.I. 2007/562)
 Mental Capacity Act 2005 (Commencement No. 1)(England and Wales) Order 2007 (S.I. 2007/563)
 Approved European Pharmacy Qualifications Order of Council 2007 (S.I. 2007/564)
 Postgraduate Medical Education and Training Board (Fees) Rules Order 2007 (S.I. 2007/565)
 School Admissions Code (Appointed Day) (England) Order 2007 (S.I. 2007/566)
 Local Authorities (Alteration of Requisite Calculations) (Wales) Regulations 2007 (S.I. 2007/571)
 Rent Repayment Orders (Supplementary Provisions) (England) Regulations 2007 (S.I. 2007/572)
 Local Authorities (Capital Finance and Accounting) (Amendment) (England) Regulations 2007 (S.I. 2007/573)
 Gambling Appeals Tribunal (Amendment) Rules 2007 (S.I. 2007/577)
 Approval of Code of Practice (Private Retirement Housing) (Wales) Order 2007 (S.I. 2007/578)
 Colours in Food (Amendment) (Wales) Regulations 2007 (S.I. 2007/579)
 Council Tax (Discount Disregards) (Amendment) (Wales) Order 2007 (S.I. 2007/580)
 Council Tax (Additional Provisions for Discount Disregards) (Amendment) (Wales) Regulations 2007 (S.I. 2007/581)
 Council Tax (Administration and Enforcement) (Amendment) (Wales) Regulations 2007 (S.I. 2007/582)
 Commons (Severance of Rights) (Wales) Order 2007 (S.I. 2007/583)
 Street Works (Inspection Fees) (England) (Amendment) Regulations 2007 (S.I. 2007/584)
 Local Government (Best Value) Performance Indicators and Performance Standards (England) (Amendment) Order 2007 (S.I. 2007/585)
 Civil Aviation Act 2006 (Commencement No.1) Order 2007 (S.I. 2007/598)
 Consistent Financial Reporting (England) (Amendment) Regulations 2007 (S.I. 2007/599)
 Office for Standards in Education, Children's Services and Skills and Her Majesty's Chief Inspector of Education, Children's Services and Skills (Allocation of Rights and Liabilities) Order 2007 (S.I. 2007/600)

601-700

 Domestic Violence, Crime and Victims Act 2004 (Commencement No. 8) Order 2007 (S.I. 2007/602)
 Education and Inspections Act 2006 (Consequential Amendments) Regulations 2007 (S.I. 2007/603)
 Blood Safety and Quality (Amendment) Regulations 2007 (S.I. 2007/604)
 Vehicle Drivers (Certificates of Professional Competence) Regulations 2007 (S.I. 2007/605)
 Passenger and Goods Vehicles (Recording Equipment) (Approval of Fitters and Workshops) (Fees) (Amendment) Regulations 2007 (S.I. 2007/606)
 Industrial Training Levy (Construction Industry Training Board) Order 2007 (S.I. 2007/607)
 Ouseburn Barrage Order 2007 (S.I. 2007/608)
 Industrial Training Levy (Engineering Construction Industry Training Board) Order 2007 (S.I. 2007/609)
 Medicines for Human Use and Medical Devices (Fees Amendments) Regulations 2007 (S.I. 2007/610)
 Waste (Amendment) (Northern Ireland) Order 2007 (S.I. 2007/611)
 District Electoral Areas Commissioner (Northern Ireland) (Amendment) Order 2007 (S.I. 2007/612)
 Civil Aviation (Isle of Man) Order 2007 (S.I. 2007/614)
 Education (Inspectors of Schools in England) Order 2007 (S.I. 2007/615)
 General Medical Council (Constitution) (Amendment) Order 2007 (S.I. 2007/616)
 European Communities (Employment in the Civil Service) Order 2007 (S.I. 2007/617)
 Disability Discrimination (Public Authorities) (Statutory Duties) (Amendment) Regulations 2007 (S.I. 2007/618)
 Hill Farm Allowance Regulations 2007 (S.I. 2007/619)
 Curf and Wimblington Combined Internal Drainage Board Order 2007 (S.I. 2007/620)
 Criminal Justice and Public Order Act 1994 (Commencement No. 14) Order 2007 (S.I. 2007/621)
 Electricity (Class Exemptions from the Requirement for a Licence) (Amendment) Order 2007 (S.I. 2007/629)
 Exempt Charities Order 2007 (S.I. 2007/630)
 Social Security (Netherlands) Order 2007 (S.I. 2007/631)
 International Transport of Goods under Cover of TIR Carnets (Fees) (Amendment) Regulations 2007 (S.I. 2007/632)
 Common Agricultural Policy Single Payment Scheme (Set-aside) (England) (Amendment) Regulations 2007 (S.I. 2007/633)
 International Carriage of Dangerous Goods by Road (Fees) (Amendment) Regulations 2007 (S.I. 2007/634)
 Plant Protection Products (Amendment) Regulations 2007 (S.I. 2007/636)
 Pigs (Records, Identification and Movement) Order 2007 (S.I. 2007/642)
 New Northern Ireland Assembly Elections (Returning Officer's Charges) (Amendment) Order 2007 (S.I. 2007/644)
 Pensions (Polish Forces) Scheme (Extension) Order 2007 (S.I. 2007/645)
 Personal Injuries (Civilians) (Amendment) Scheme 2007 (S.I. 2007/646)
 Bus Lane Contraventions (Approved Local Authorities) (England) (Amendment) (No. 2) Order 2007 (S.I. 2007/647)
 Road Traffic (Permitted Parking Area and Special Parking Area) (Isle of Wight) Order 2007 (S.I. 2007/648)
 Consular Fees Order 2007 (S.I. 2007/649)
 Royal Air Force Terms of Service Regulations 2007 (S.I. 2007/650)
 Air Force Act 1955 (Part 1) Regulations 2007 (S.I. 2007/651)
 Road Traffic (Permitted Parking Area and Special Parking Area) (County of Hampshire) (Borough of Fareham) Order 2007 (S.I. 2007/652)
 Warwick (Parishes) Order 2007 (S.I. 2007/656)
 Courts-Martial Appeal (Review of Sentencing) Regulations 2007 (S.I. 2007/660)
 Lord Chancellor (Transfer of Functions and Supplementary Provisions) Order 2007 (S.I. 2007/661)
 Armed Forces Act 2001 (Commencement No.8) Order 2007 (S.I. 2007/662)
 Road Traffic (Permitted Parking Area and Special Parking Area) (County of Surrey) (Borough of Waverley) Order 2007 (S.I. 2007/664)
 Income Tax (Construction Industry Scheme) (Amendment) Regulations 2007 (S.I. 2007/672)
 Curd Cheese (Restriction on Placing on the Market) (England) (Revocation) Regulations 2007 (S.I. 2007/673)
 National Health Service (Pharmaceutical Services) (Remuneration for Persons providing Pharmaceutical Services) (Amendment) Regulations 2007 (S.I. 2007/674)
 Judicial Pensions and Retirement Act 1993 (Addition of Qualifying Judicial Offices) Order 2007 (S.I. 2007/675)
 Blackburn with Darwen (Maintained Nursery School Governance) (Amendment) Order 2007 (S.I. 2007/676)
 Patents (Amendment) Rules 2007 (S.I. 2007/677)
 Corporation Tax (Surrender of Terminal Losses on Films and Claims for Relief) Regulations 2007 (S.I. 2007/678)
 Mental Capacity Act 2005 (Loss of Capacity during Research Project) (England) Regulations 2007 (S.I. 2007/679)
 Civil Proceedings Fees (Amendment) Order 2007 (S.I. 2007/680)
 Public Trustee (Fees) (Amendment) Order 2007 (S.I. 2007/681)
 Family Proceedings Fees (Amendment) Order 2007 (S.I. 2007/682)
 Authorised Investment Funds (Tax) (Amendment) Regulations 2007 (S.I. 2007/683)
 Taxes (Interest Rate) (Amendment) Regulations 2007 (S.I. 2007/684)
 Guaranteed Minimum Pensions Increase Order 2007 (S.I. 2007/686)
 Goods Vehicles (Licensing of Operators) (Fees) (Amendment) Regulations 2007 (S.I. 2007/687)
 Social Security Benefits Up-rating Order 2007 (S.I. 2007/688)
 Public Service Vehicles (Operators' Licences) (Fees) (Amendment) Regulations 2007 (S.I. 2007/689)
 Public Service Vehicles (Registration of Local Services) (Amendment) (England and Wales) Regulations 2007 (S.I. 2007/690)
 Minibus and Other Section 19 Permit Buses (Amendment) Regulations 2007 (S.I. 2007/691)
 Curd Cheese (Restriction on Placing on the Market) (Wales) (Revocation) Regulations 2007 692)
 Community Bus (Amendment) Regulations 2007 (S.I. 2007/693)
 Her Majesty's Chief Inspector of Education, Children's Services and Skills (Fees and Frequency of Inspections) (Children's Homes etc.) Regulations 2007 (S.I. 2007/694)
 Gangmasters (Licensing) Act 2004 (Commencement No. 5) Order 2007 (S.I. 2007/695)
 Awards for All (England) Joint Scheme (Authorisation) Order 2007 (S.I. 2007/696)
 Motor Cars (Driving Instruction) (Amendment) Regulations 2007 (S.I. 2007/697)
 Motor Vehicles (Driving Licences) (Amendment) Regulations 2007 (S.I. 2007/698)
 Criminal Procedure (Amendment) Rules 2007 (S.I. 2007/699)
 Police Act 1997 (Criminal Records) (Amendment) Regulations 2007 (S.I. 2007/700)

701-800

 Controls on Dogs (Non-application to Designated Land) (Wales) Order 2007 (S.I. 2007/701)
 Dog Control Orders (Miscellaneous Provisions) (Wales) Regulations 2007 (S.I. 2007/702)
 Prevention of Terrorism Act 2005 (Continuance in force of sections 1 to 9) Order 2007 (S.I. 2007/706)
 Criminal Justice Act 2003 (Surcharge) Order 2007 (S.I. 2007/707)
 Houses in Multiple Occupation (Specified Educational Establishments) (England) Regulations 2007 (S.I. 2007/708)
 Police and Justice Act 2006 (Commencement No. 2, Transitional and Saving Provisions) Order 2007 (S.I. 2007/709)
 Courts-Martial Appeal (Amendment) Rules 2007 (S.I. 2007/710)
 Courts-Martial (Review of Sentencing) (Categories of Offences) Order 2007 (S.I. 2007/711)
 Education (Provision of Information About Young Children) (England) Regulations 2007 (S.I. 2007/712)
 Pollution Prevention and Control (England and Wales) (Amendment) Regulations 2007 (S.I. 2007/713)
 Road Traffic (Permitted Parking Area and Special Parking Area) (County of Gwynedd) Order 2007 (S.I. 2007/714)
 Northern Ireland Arms Decommissioning Act 1997 (Amnesty Period) Order 2007 (S.I. 2007/715)
 Pneumoconiosis etc. (Workers' Compensation) (Payment of Claims) (Amendment) Regulations 2007 (S.I. 2007/716)
 Air Quality Standards (Wales) Regulations 2007 (S.I. 2007/717)
 Communications (Television Licensing) (Amendment) Regulations 2007 (S.I. 2007/718)
 Social Security (Miscellaneous Amendments) Regulations 2007 (S.I. 2007/719)
 Plant Health (Plant Passport Fees) (England) Regulations 2007 (S.I. 2007/720)
 Protection of Wrecks (Designation) (England) (No. 2) Order 2007 (S.I. 2007/721)
 Childcare (Supply and Disclosure of Information) (England) Regulations 2007 (S.I. 2007/722)
 Childcare (Disqualification) Regulations 2007 (S.I. 2007/723)
 Licensing Act 2003 (Consequential Amendment) (Non-Domestic Rating) (Public Houses in England) Order 2007 (S.I. 2007/724)
 National Assistance (Sums for Personal Requirements and Assessment of Resources) Amendment (England) Regulations 2007 (S.I. 2007/725)
 Government of Wales Act 2006 (Transitional Provisions) (Finance) Order 2007 (S.I. 2007/726)
 Water Resources Management Plan Regulations 2007 (S.I. 2007/727)
 Local Inquiries, Qualifying Inquiries and Qualifying Procedures (Standard Daily Amount) (Wales) Regulations 2007 (S.I. 2007/728)
 Court Funds (Amendment) Rules 2007 (S.I. 2007/729)
 Childcare (Voluntary Registration) Regulations 2007 (S.I. 2007/730)
 Income-related Benefits (Subsidy to Authorities) Amendment Order 2007 (S.I. 2007/731)
 Companies (EEA State) Regulations 2007 (S.I. 2007/732)
 Children and Adoption Act 2006 (Commencement No. 1) (Wales) Order 2007 (S.I. 2007/733)
 Rules of the Air Regulations 2007 (S.I. 2007/734)
 Fire and Rescue Services (Emergencies) (England) Order 2007 (S.I. 2007/735)
 Children (Performances) (Amendment) (Wales) Regulations 2007 (S.I. 2007/736)
 Norfolk (Coroners' Districts) Order 2007 (S.I. 2007/737)
 Environmental Offences (Fixed Penalties) (Miscellaneous Provisions) (Wales) Regulations 2007 (S.I. 2007/739)
 Tuberculosis (England) Order 2007 (S.I. 2007/740)
 Sex Discrimination Code of Practice (Public Authorities) (Duty to Promote Equality) (Appointed Day) Order 2007 (S.I. 2007/741)
 Legal Aid in Family Proceedings (Remuneration) (Amendment) Regulations 2007 (S.I. 2007/742)
 National Lottery etc. Act 1993 (Amendment of Section 23) Order 2007 (S.I. 2007/743)
 British Citizenship (Designated Service) (Amendment) Order 2007 (S.I. 2007/744)
 Smoke-free (Vehicle Operators and Penalty Notices) Regulations 2007 (S.I. 2007/760)
 Financial Services and Markets Act 2000 (Markets in Financial Instruments) (Amendment) Regulations 2007 (S.I. 2007/763)
 Smoke-free (Penalties and Discounted Amounts) Regulations 2007 (S.I. 2007/764)
 Smoke-free (Exemptions and Vehicles) Regulations 2007 (S.I. 2007/765)
 Transfer of the Northern Ireland Water Service (Tax) Regulations 2007 (S.I. 2007/766)
 Children and Young Persons (Sale of Tobacco etc.) Order 2007 S.I. 2007/767)
 Value Added Tax (Amendment) (No.2) Regulations 2007 (S.I. 2007/768)
 Social Security (Industrial Injuries) (Dependency) (Permitted Earnings Limits) Order 2007 (S.I. 2007/769)
 Research Councils (Transfer of Property etc.) Order 2007 (S.I. 2007/770)
 Pension Protection Fund (Waiver of Pension Protection Levy and Consequential Amendments) Regulations 2007 (S.I. 2007/771)
 Planning etc. (Scotland) Act 2006 (Business Improvement Districts Levy) Order 2007 (S.I. 2007/772)
 Discharge of Fines by Unpaid Work (Pilot Schemes) (Amendment) Order 2007 (S.I. 2007/773)
 Children (Allocation of Proceedings) (Amendment) Order 2007 (S.I. 2007/774)
 Social Security Benefits Up-rating Regulations 2007 (S.I. 2007/775)
 Social Security Pensions (Low Earnings Threshold) Order 2007 (S.I. 2007/776)
 Criminal Defence Service (Financial Eligibility) (Amendment) Regulations 2007 (S.I. 2007/777)
 Student Fees (Qualifying Courses and Persons) (England) Regulations 2007 (S.I. 2007/778)
 Education (Fees and Awards) (England) Regulations 2007 (S.I. 2007/779)
 Criminal Defence Service (General) (No. 2) (Amendment) Regulations 2007 (S.I. 2007/780)
 Social Security Revaluation of Earnings Factors Order 2007 (S.I. 2007/781)
 Pension Protection Fund (Miscellaneous Amendments) Regulations 2007 (S.I. 2007/782)
 Town and Country Planning (Control of Advertisements) (England) Regulations 2007 (S.I. 2007/783)
 Housing (Right to Buy) (Prescribed Forms) (Amendment) (England) Regulations 2007 (S.I. 2007/784)
 National Insurance Contributions (Application of Part 7 of the Finance Act 2004) Regulations 2007 (S.I. 2007/785)
 Civil Courts (Amendment) Order 2007 (S.I. 2007/786)
 Smoke-free Premises etc. (Wales) Regulations 2007 787)
 Plant Health (Import Inspection Fees) (England) (Amendment) Regulations 2007 (S.I. 2007/788)
 Charities Act 2006 (Interim changes in threshold for registration of small charities) Order 2007 (S.I. 2007/789)
 Ticket Touting (Designation of Football Matches) Order 2007 (S.I. 2007/790)
 Private Security Industry (Licence Fees) Order 2007 (S.I. 2007/791)
 Employee Share Schemes (Electronic Communication of Returns and Information) Regulations 2007 (S.I. 2007/792)
 Registered Pension Schemes (Splitting of Schemes) (Amendment) Regulations 2007 (S.I. 2007/793)
 Authorised Investment Funds (Tax) (Amendment No. 2) Regulations 2007 794)
 Social Security Contributions and Benefits (Northern Ireland) Act 1992 (Modification of Section 10(7B)) Regulations 2007 (S.I. 2007/795)
 Housing (Tenancy Deposit Schemes) Order 2007 (S.I. 2007/796)
 Housing (Tenancy Deposits) (Prescribed Information) Order 2007 (S.I. 2007/797)
 Housing (Tenancy Deposits) (Specified Interest Rate) Order 2007 (S.I. 2007/798)
 Social Security Contributions and Benefits Act 1992 (Modification of Section 10(7B)) Regulations 2007 (S.I. 2007/799)
 Financial Services and Markets Act 2000 (Collective Investment Schemes) (Amendment) Order 2007  (S.I. 2007/800)

801-900

 Pensions Increase (Review) Order 2007 (S.I. 2007/801)
 Pensions Increase (Pension Schemes for Kenneth Macdonald) Regulations 2007 (S.I. 2007/802)
 Medicines for Human Use and Medical Devices (Fees Amendments) (No.2) Regulations 2007 (S.I. 2007/803)
 Workmen's Compensation (Supplementation) (Amendment) Scheme 2007 (S.I. 2007/804)
 Licensing Act 2003 (Welsh Language Forms) Order 2007 (S.I. 2007/805)
 Local Authorities (Alcohol Consumption in Designated Public Places) Regulations 2007 (S.I. 2007/806)
 Immigration and Nationality (Fees) Order 2007 (S.I. 2007/807)
 Private Security Industry Act 2001 (Approved Contractor Scheme) Regulations 2007 (S.I. 2007/808)
 Undersized Bass Order 2007 (S.I. 2007/809)
 Private Security Industry Act 2001 (Licences) Regulations 2007 (S.I. 2007/810)
 Social Security (Industrial Injuries) (Prescribed Diseases) Amendment Regulations 2007 (S.I. 2007/811)
 General Teaching Council for Wales (Constitution) (Amendment) Regulations 2007 (S.I. 2007/812)
 Occupational and Personal Pension Schemes (Miscellaneous Amendments) Regulations 2007 (S.I. 2007/814)
 Natural Environment and Rural Communities Act 2006 (Commencement No. 4) Order 2007 (S.I. 2007/816)
 Tax Credits (Miscellaneous Amendments) Regulations 2007 (S.I. 2007/824)
 Employment Equality (Age) (Consequential Amendments) Regulations 2007 (S.I. 2007/825)
 Registered Pension Schemes (Bridging Pensions) Regulations 2007 (S.I. 2007/826)
 Consumer Credit (Advertisements) (Amendment) Regulations 2007 (S.I. 2007/827)
 Tax Credits Up-rating Regulations 2007 (S.I. 2007/828)
 Taxation of Pension Schemes (Protected Rights and Pension Commencement Lump Sums) (Amendment) Order 2007 (S.I. 2007/829)
 Credit Institutions (Reorganisation and Winding Up) (Amendment) Regulations 2007 (S.I. 2007/830)
 Energy-Saving Items Regulations 2007 (S.I. 2007/831)
 Financial Markets and Insolvency (Settlement Finality) (Amendment) Regulations 2007 (S.I. 2007/832)
 Mental Capacity Act 2005 (Appropriate Body) (Wales) Regulations 2007 (S.I. 2007/833)
 Pension Protection Fund (Contributions Equivalent Premium) Regulations 2007 (S.I. 2007/834)
 Asylum and Immigration Tribunal (Procedure) (Amendment) Rules 2007 (S.I. 2007/835)
 National Health Service Trusts (Originating Capital) Order 2007 (S.I. 2007/836)
 Mental Capacity Act 2005 (Loss of Capacity during Research Project) (Wales) Regulations 2007 (S.I. 2007/837)
 Registered Pension Schemes (Block Transfers) (Permitted Membership Period) (Amendment) Regulations 2007 (S.I. 2007/838)
 Gender Recognition (Application Fees) (Amendment) Order 2007 (S.I. 2007/839)
 Contaminants in Food (Wales) Regulations 2007 (S.I. 2007/840)
 Electricity Generating Stations and Overhead Lines (Inquiries Procedure) (England and Wales) Rules 2007 (S.I. 2007/841)
 Cattle Identification (Wales) Regulations 2007 (S.I. 2007/842)
 Meat (Official Controls Charges) (Wales) Regulations 2007 (S.I. 2007/843)
 Dairy Produce Quotas (Wales) (Amendment) Regulations 2007 (S.I. 2007/844)
 Asylum and Immigration (Treatment of Claimants, etc.) Act 2004 (Commencement No. 1) (Northern Ireland) Order 2007 (S.I. 2007/845)
 Financial Services and Markets Act 2000 (Administration Orders Relating to Insurers)(Northern Ireland) Order 2007 (S.I. 2007/846)
 Wireless Telegraphy (Licence Award) (Amendment) Regulations 2007 (S.I. 2007/847)
 Government of Wales Act 2006 (Designation of Receipts) Order 2007 (S.I. 2007/848)
 Income Tax (Qualifying Child Care) Regulations 2007 (S.I. 2007/849)
 Tonnage Tax (Exception of Financial Year 2007) Order 2007 (S.I. 2007/850)
 Insurers (Reorganisation and Winding Up) (Amendment) Regulations 2007 (S.I. 2007/851)
 Mental Capacity Act 2005 (Independent Mental Capacity Advocates) (Wales) Regulations 2007 (S.I. 2007/852)
 Road Transport (Working Time) (Amendment) Regulations 2007 (S.I. 2007/853)
 Further Education Corporations (Publication of Draft Orders) (Wales) Regulations 2007 (S.I. 2007/854)
 Motor Vehicles (EC Type Approval) (Amendment) Regulations 2007 (S.I. 2007/855)
 Mental Capacity Act 2005 (Commencement) (Wales) Order 2007 (S.I. 2007/856)
 Undersized Bass (Revocation) Order 2007 (S.I. 2007/857)
 Violent Crime Reduction Act 2006 (Commencement No. 2) Order 2007 (S.I. 2007/858)
 Building Societies (Accounts and Related Provisions) (Amendment) Regulations 2007 (S.I. 2007/859)
 Building Societies Act 1986 (Substitution of Specified Amounts and Modification of the Funding Limit Calculation) Order 2007 (S.I. 2007/860)
 East London and The City Mental Health National Health Service Trust (Change of Name) (Establishment) Amendment Order 2007 (S.I. 2007/861)
 Parsonages Measure (Amendment) Rules 2007 (S.I. 2007/862)
 Asylum Support (Amendment) Regulations 2007 (S.I. 2007/863)
 Diseases of Fish (England and Wales) Order 2007 (S.I. 2007/864)
 Pension Protection Fund (Closed Schemes) Regulations 2007 (S.I. 2007/865)
 Lottery Duty (Amendment) Regulations 2007 (S.I. 2007/870)
 Producer Responsibility Obligations (Packaging Waste) Regulations 2007 (S.I. 2007/871)
 Hallmarking Act 1973 (Amendment) Regulations 2007 (S.I. 2007/872)
 Hallmarking Act 1973 (Exemption) (Amendment) Order 2007 (S.I. 2007/880)
 Orders for the Delivery of Documents (Procedure) (Amendment) Regulations 2007 (S.I. 2007/881)
 Immigration (Leave to Remain) (Prescribed Forms and Procedures) Regulations 2007 (S.I. 2007/882)
 A66 Trunk Road (South Stockton Link Slip Roads) (Trunking) Order 2007 (S.I. 2007/885)
 Nursing and Midwifery Council (Fitness to Practise) (Amendment) Rules Order of Council 2007 (S.I. 2007/893)

901-1000

 Environmental Offences (Use of Fixed Penalty Receipts) Regulations 2007 (S.I. 2007/901)
 Community Legal Service (Financial) (Amendment) Regulations 2007 (S.I. 2007/906)
 Education (Chief Inspector of Education and Training in Wales) Order 2007 (S.I. 2007/907)
 Service Departments Registers (Amendment) Order 2007 (S.I. 2007/908)
 Naval, Military and Air Forces Etc. (Disablement and Death) Service Pensions (Amendment) Order 2007 (S.I. 2007/909)
 National Assembly for Wales (Legislative Competence) (Conversion of Framework Powers) Order 2007 (S.I. 2007/910)
 Northern Ireland Policing Board (Northern Ireland) Order 2007 (S.I. 2007/911)
 Policing (Miscellaneous Provisions) (Northern Ireland) Order 2007 (S.I. 2007/912)
 Electricity (Single Wholesale Market) (Northern Ireland) Order 2007 (S.I. 2007/913)
 Budget (Northern Ireland) Order 2007 (S.I. 2007/914)
 Foyle and Carlingford Fisheries (Northern Ireland) Order 2007 (S.I. 2007/915)
 Road Traffic (Northern Ireland) Order 2007 (S.I. 2007/916)
 Health and Social Care (Community Health and Standards) Act 2003 Consequential Provisions (Recovery of NHS Charges) Order 2007 (S.I. 2007/917)
 Compensation Act 2006 (Commencement No. 3) Order 2007 (S.I. 2007/922)
 Smoke-free (Signs) Regulations 2007 (S.I. 2007/923)
 Employment Zones (Amendment) Regulations 2007 (S.I. 2007/924)
 Representation of the People (Scotland) (Amendment) Regulations 2007 (S.I. 2007/925)
 Part 7 of the Anti-terrorism, Crime and Security Act 2001 (Extension to Animal Pathogens) Order 2007 (S.I. 2007/926)
 Sea Fishing (Restriction on Days at Sea) Order 2007 (S.I. 2007/927)
 Accession (Immigration and Worker Registration) (Amendment) Regulations 2007 (S.I. 2007/928)
 Schedule 5 to the Anti-terrorism, Crime and Security Act 2001 (Modification) Order 2007 (S.I. 2007/929)
 Serious Organised Crime and Police Act 2005 (Designated Sites under Section 128) Order 2007 (S.I. 2007/930)
 Local Electoral Administration and Registration Services (Scotland) Act 2006 (Consequential Provisions and Modifications) Order 2007 (S.I. 2007/931)
 Security of Animal Pathogens (Exceptions to Dangerous Substances) Regulations 2007 (S.I. 2007/932)
 Offshore Petroleum Production and Pipe-lines (Assessment of Environmental Effects) (Amendment) Regulations 2007 (S.I. 2007/933)
 Regulation of Investigatory Powers (Authorisations Extending to Scotland) Order 2007 (S.I. 2007/934)
 Education and Inspections Act 2006 (Commencement No. 3 and Transitional Provisions and Savings) Order 2007 (S.I. 2007/935)
 Immigration and Nationality (Cost Recovery Fees) Regulations 2007 (S.I. 2007/936)
 Scottish Parliament (Elections etc.) Order 2007 (S.I. 2007/937)
 Offshore Combustion Installations (Prevention and Control of Pollution) (Amendment) Regulations 2007 (S.I. 2007/938)
 Value Added Tax (Amendment of section 77A of the Value Added Tax Act 1994) Order 2007 (S.I. 2007/939)
 Income Tax Act 2007 (Amendment) Order 2007 (S.I. 2007/940)
 Value Added Tax (Increase of Registration Limits) Order 2007 (S.I. 2007/941)
 Capital Gains Tax (Annual Exempt Amount) Order 2007 (S.I. 2007/942)
 Income Tax (Indexation) Order 2007 (S.I. 2007/943)
 Staffing of Maintained Schools (Miscellaneous Amendments) (Wales) Regulations 2007 (S.I. 2007/944)
 Business Premises Renovation Allowances Regulations 2007 (S.I. 2007/945)
 Finance (No. 2) Act 2005, Section 2(7), (Appointed Day) Order 2007 (S.I. 2007/946)
 Independent Schools (Miscellaneous Amendments) (Wales) Regulations 2007 (S.I. 2007/947)
 Loan Relationships and Derivative Contracts (Disregard and Bringing into Account of Profits and Losses) (Amendment) Regulations 2007 (S.I. 2007/948)
 Finance Act 2005, Section 92 and Schedule 6, (Appointed Day) Order 2007 (S.I. 2007/949)
 Loan Relationships and Derivative Contracts (Change of Accounting Practice) (Amendment) Regulations 2007 (S.I. 2007/950)
 Local Authorities (Executive Arrangements) (Decisions, Documents and Meetings) and the Standards Committees (Wales) (Amendment) Regulations 2007 (S.I. 2007/951)
 Planning and Compulsory Purchase Act 2004 (Commencement No.4 and Consequential, Transitional and Savings Provisions) (Wales) (Amendment No.2) Order 2007 (S.I. 2007/952)
 Local Health Boards (Constitution, Membership and Procedures) (Wales) (Amendment) Regulations 2007 (S.I. 2007/953)
 Avian Influenza (Fees for the Licensed Vaccination of Birds) (England) Regulations 2007 (S.I. 2007/954)
 A590 Trunk Road in the District of Barrow-in-Furness (From Junction with A5087 Hindpool Road to Junction with C6011 Park Road) (Detrunking) Order 2007 (S.I. 2007/955)
 School Governance (Constitution) (England) Regulations 2007 (S.I. 2007/957)
 School Governance (New Schools) (England) Regulations 2007 (S.I. 2007/958)
 School Governance (Procedures) (England) (Amendment) Regulations 2007 (S.I. 2007/959)
 School Governance (Federations) (England) Regulations 2007 (S.I. 2007/960)
 References to Health Authorities Order 2007 (S.I. 2007/961)
 Post Office Network Subsidy Scheme Order 2007 (S.I. 2007/962)
 Finance Act 1995, Section 127(12), (Designated Transactions) Regulations 2007 (S.I. 2007/963)
 Finance Act 2003, Paragraph 3(3) of Schedule 26, (Designated Transactions) Regulations 2007 (S.I. 2007/964)
 Landfill Tax (Amendment) Regulations 2007 (S.I. 2007/965)
 Value Added Tax (Consideration for Fuel Provided for Private Use) Order 2007 (S.I. 2007/966)
 Constitutional Reform Act 2005 (Commencement No. 7) Order 2007 (S.I. 2007/967)
 Working Tax Credit (Entitlement and Maximum Rate) (Amendment) Regulations 2007 (S.I. 2007/968)
 Local Government (Access to Information) (Variation) (Wales) Order 2007 (S.I. 2007/969)
 Common Agricultural Policy Single Payment and Support Schemes (Cross-compliance) (Wales) (Amendment) Regulations 2007 (S.I. 2007/970)
 Pesticides (Maximum Residue Levels in Crops, Food and Feeding Stuffs) (England and Wales) (Amendment) Regulations 2007 (S.I. 2007/971)
 Designation of Schools Having a Religious Character (Wales) Order 2007 (S.I. 2007/972)
 National Health Service (Travel Expenses and Remission of Charges) Amendment Regulations 2007 (S.I. 2007/988)
 Pension Protection Fund (Pension Compensation Cap) Order 2007 (S.I. 2007/989)
 Electricity Act 1989 (Exemption from the Requirement for a Generation Licence) (Gunfleet Sand) (England and Wales) Order 2007 (S.I. 2007/990)
 Energy Performance of Buildings (Certificates and Inspections) (England and Wales) Regulations 2007 (S.I. 2007/991)
 Home Information Pack Regulations 2007 (S.I. 2007/992)
 Electricity Act 1989 (Exemption from the Requirement for a Generation Licence) (Burbo Bank) (England and Wales) Order 2007 (S.I. 2007/993)
 Occupational Pension Schemes (Levies) (Amendment) Regulations 2007 (S.I. 2007/994)

1001-1100

 Occupational Pension Schemes (Levy Ceiling) Order 2007 (S.I. 2007/1012)
 Local Elections (Communities) (Welsh Forms) Order 2007 (S.I. 2007/1013)
 Parliamentary Elections (Welsh Forms) Order 2007 (S.I. 2007/1014)
 Local Elections (Principal Areas) (Welsh Forms) Order 2007 (S.I. 2007/1015)
 Northern Ireland Act 2000 (Restoration of Devolved Government) Order 2007 (S.I. 2007/1016)
 Offshore Installations (Safety Zones) (No. 2) Order 2007 (S.I. 2007/1017)
 Road Vehicles (Registration and Licensing) (Amendment) (No. 2) Regulations 2007 (S.I. 2007/1018)
 Childcare Act 2006 (Commencement No. 2 and Savings and Transitional Provisions) Order 2007 (S.I. 2007/1019)
 Transport of Animals (Cleansing and Disinfection) (England) (No. 3) (Amendment) Order 2007 (S.I. 2007/1020)
 Water Act 2003 (Commencement No. 7 and Transitional Provisions) Order 2007S.I. 2007/1021)
 Courts Boards Areas (Amendment) Order 2007 (S.I. 2007/1022)
 Planning and Compulsory Purchase Act 2004 (Commencement No. 4 and Consequential, Transitional and Savings Provisions) (Wales) (Amendment No. 2) Order 2007 (S.I. 2007/1023)
 Local Authorities (Mayoral Elections) (England and Wales) Regulations 2007 (S.I. 2007/1024)
 Representation of the People (England and Wales) and the Representation of the People (Combination of Polls) (England and Wales) (Amendment) Regulations 2007 (S.I. 2007/1025)
 National Health Service (General Ophthalmic Services) (Amendment) (Wales) (No. 2) Regulations 2007 (S.I. 2007/1026)
 Welfare of Animals (Miscellaneous Revocations) (Wales) Regulations 2007 (S.I. 2007/1027)
 Docking of Working Dogs' Tails (Wales) Regulations 2007 (S.I. 2007/1028)
 Mutilations (Permitted Procedures) (Wales) Regulations 2007 (S.I. 2007/S.I. 2007/1029)
 Animal Welfare Act 2006 (Commencement No. 1) (Wales) Order 2007 (S.I. 2007/1030)
 Insurance Companies (Corporation Tax Acts) (Amendment) Order 2007 (S.I. 2007/1031)
 Commons Registration (General) (Amendment) (England) Regulations 2007 (S.I. 2007/1032)
 Social Security (Work-focused Interviews for Lone Parents) Amendment Regulations 2007 (S.I. 2007/1034)
 Crime and Disorder Act 1998 (Responsible Authorities) Order 2007 (S.I. 2007/1035)
 Religion or Belief (Questions and Replies) Order 2007 (S.I. 2007/1038)
 National Health Service (Optical Charges and Payments) (Amendment) (Wales) Regulations 2007 (S.I. 2007/1039)
 Notification of Marketing of Food for Particular Nutritional Uses (Wales) Regulations 2007 (S.I. 2007/1040)
 National Assistance (Assessment of Resources and Sums for Personal Requirements) (Amendments) (Wales) Regulations 2007 (S.I. 2007/1041)
 Health, Social Care and Well-being Strategies (Wales) (Amendment) Regulations 2007 (S.I. 2007/1042)
 Road Traffic (Permitted Parking Area and Special Parking Area) (County of the Isle of Anglesey) Order 2007 (S.I. 2007/1043)
 Animals and Animal Products (Import and Export) (England) (Imports of Captive Birds) Regulations 2007 (S.I. 2007/1044)
 Assembly Learning Grants and Loans (Higher Education) (Wales) Regulations 2007 (S.I. 2007/1045)
 Cattle Identification (Amendment) Regulations 2007 (S.I. 2007/1046)
 Welfare of Animals (Transport) (Wales) Order 2007 (S.I. 2007/1047)
 National Health Service (Optical Charges and Payments) (Amendment) (Wales) (No. 2) Regulations 2007 (S.I. 2007/1048)
 Children's Commissioner for Wales (Appointment) (Amendment) Regulations 2007 (S.I. 2007/1049)
 Corporation Tax (Taxation of Films) (Transitional Provisions) Regulations 2007 (S.I. 2007/1050)
 Local Authorities (Capital Finance and Accounting) (Wales) (Amendment) Regulations 2007 (S.I. 2007/1051)
 Social Security (Contributions) (Re-rating and National Insurance Funds Payments) Order 2007 (S.I. 2007/1052)
 Child Benefit Up-rating Order 2007 (S.I. 2007/1053)
 Guardian's Allowance Up-rating Order 2007 (S.I. 2007/1054)
 Guardian's Allowance Up-rating (Northern Ireland) Order 2007 (S.I. 2007/1055)
 Social Security Contributions (Consequential Provisions) Regulations 2007 (S.I. 2007/1056)
 Social Security (Contributions) (Amendment No. 2) Regulations 2007 (S.I. 2007/1057)
 Highways (Environmental Impact Assessment) Regulations 2007 (S.I. 2007/1062)
 Childcare (Provision of Information) (England) Regulations 2007 (S.I. 2007/1063)
 London Olympic Games and Paralympic Games Act 2006 (Commencement No. 2) Order 2007 (S.I. 2007/1064)
 Education (Information About Children in Alternative Provision) (England) Regulations 2007 (S.I. 2007/1065)
 Atomic Weapons Establishment (AWE) Aldermaston Byelaws 2007 (S.I. 2007/1066)
 Environmental Impact Assessment and Natural Habitats (Extraction of Minerals by Marine Dredging) (England and Northern Ireland) Regulations 2007 (S.I. 2007/1067)
 Housing Act 2004 (Commencement No. 7) (England) Order 2007 (S.I. 2007/1068)
 Education (Pupil Referral Units) (Application of Enactments) (Wales) Regulations 2007 (S.I. 2007/1069)
 Housing Act 2004 (Commencement No. 7) (England) Order 2007 (S.I. 2007/1070)
 Guardian's Allowance Up-rating Regulations 2007 (S.I. 2007/1071)
 Firefighters' Pension Scheme (Wales) Order 2007 (S.I. 2007/1072)
 Firefighters' Compensation Scheme (Wales) Order 2007 (S.I. 2007/1073)
 Firefighters' Pension Scheme (Wales) (Amendment) Order 2007 (S.I. 2007/1074)
 Fire and Rescue National Framework (Wales) 2005 (Revisions) Order 2007 (S.I. 2007/1075)
 Food Supplements (Wales) (Amendment) Regulations 2007 (S.I. 2007/1076)
 Income Tax (Pay as You Earn) (Amendment) Regulations 2007 (S.I. 2007/1077)
 Renewables Obligation Order 2006 (Amendment) Order 2007 (S.I. 2007/1078)
 Criminal Justice Act 2003 (Surcharge)(No. 2) Order 2007 (S.I. 2007/1079)
 Animals and Animal Products (Import and Export) (Wales) (Imports of Captive Birds) Regulations 2007 (S.I. 2007/1080)
 Finance Act 2006 (Section 94(5)) (PAYE: Retrospective Notional Payments — Appointment of Substituted Date) Order 2007 (S.I. 2007/1081)
 Jobseeker's Allowance (Jobseeker Mandatory Activity) Pilot Regulations 2007 (S.I. 2007/1082)
 Financial Services and Markets Act 2000 (Financial Promotion) (Amendment) Order 2007 (S.I. 2007/1083)
 Home-Grown Cereals Authority (Rate of Levy) Order 2007 (S.I. 2007/1084)
 Waste Electrical and Electronic Equipment (Waste Management Licensing) (England and Wales) (Amendment) Regulations 2007 (S.I. 2007/1085)
 Local Authorities (Allowances for Members) (Wales) Regulations 2007 (S.I. 2007/1086)
 Education (Independent School Standards) (England) (Amendment) Regulations 2007 (S.I. 2007/1087)
 Education (Non-Maintained Special Schools) (England) (Amendment) Regulations 2007 (S.I. 2007/1088)
 Education (Investigation of Parents' Complaints) (England) Regulations 2007 (S.I. 2007/1089)
 Compensation (Exemptions) (Amendment) (No. 1) Order 2007 (S.I. 2007/1090)
 Energy Act 2004 (Commencement No. 8) Order 2007 (S.I. 2007/1091)
 Equality Act 2006 (Commencement No. 2) Order 2007 (S.I. 2007/1092)
 Companies Act 2006 (Commencement No. 2, Consequential Amendments, Transitional Provisions and Savings) Order 2007 (S.I. 2007/1093)
 Social Security (Contributions) (Re-rating) Consequential Amendment Regulations 2007 (S.I. 2007/1094)
 Common Investment (Amendment) Scheme 2007 (S.I. 2007/1095)
 Greenhouse Gas Emissions Trading Scheme (Miscellaneous Provisions) Regulations 2007 (S.I. 2007/1096)
 Stamp Duty and Stamp Duty Reserve Tax (Investment Exchanges and Clearing Houses) (Eurex Clearing AG) Regulations 2007 (S.I. 2007/1097)
 Police, Public Order and Criminal Justice (Scotland) Act 2006 (Consequential Provisions and Modifications) Order 2007 (S.I. 2007/1098)
 Children (Allocation of Proceedings) (Amendment No. 2) Order 2007 (S.I. 2007/1099)
 Mutilations (Permitted Procedures) (England) Regulations 2007 (S.I. 2007/1100)

1101-1200

 Welfare of Animals (Miscellaneous Revocations) (England) Regulations 2007 (S.I. 2007/1101)
 Health and Social Care (Community Health and Standards) Act 2003 Commencement (No. 3) (Amendment) Order 2007 (S.I. 2007/1102)
 Tourist Boards (Scotland) Act 2006 (Consequential Modifications) Order 2007 (S.I. 2007/1103)
 National Health Service (Travelling Expenses and Remission of Charges) (Wales) Regulations 2007 (S.I. 2007/S.I. 2007/1104)
 Immigration, Asylum and Nationality Act 2006 (Commencement No. 6) Order 2007 (S.I. 2007/1109)
 National Health Service (Pharmaceutical Services) (Remuneration for Persons providing Pharmaceutical Services) (Amendment) (Wales) Regulations 2007 (S.I. 2007/1112)
 Air Navigation (Isle of Man) Order 2007 (S.I. 2007/1115)
 Parliamentary Copyright (National Assembly for Wales) Order 2007 (S.I. 2007/1116)
 National Assembly for Wales (Diversion of Functions) Order 2007 (S.I. 2007/1117)
 National Assembly for Wales Commission (Crown Status) Order 2007 (S.I. 2007/1118)
 Inspectors of Education, Children's Services and Skills Order 2007 (S.I. 2007/1119)
 Docking of Working Dogs' Tails (England) Regulations 2007 (S.I. 2007/1020)
 Constitutional Reform Act 2005 (Commencement No. 8) Order 2007 (S.I. 2007/1121)
 Immigration (Leave to Remain) (Prescribed Forms and Procedures) (Amendment) Regulations 2007 (S.I. 2007/1122)
 Social Security, Occupational Pension Schemes and Statutory Payments (Consequential Provisions) Regulations 2007 (S.I. 2007/1154)
 Gambling Act 2005 (Commencement and Transitional Provisions) (Amendment) Order 2007 (S.I. 2007/1157)
 Immigration and Nationality (Fees) Regulations 2007 (S.I. 2007/1158)
 Local Authorities (Model Code of Conduct) Order 2007 (S.I. 2007/1159)
 Police (Amendment) Regulations 2007 (S.I. 2007/1160)
 Motor Vehicles (Tests) (Amendment) (No. 2) Regulations 2007 (S.I. 2007/1161)
 Police (Fingerprints) Regulations 2007 (S.I. 2007/1162)
 Northern Ireland Act 2000 (Modification) Order 2007 (S.I. 2007/1163)
 Cumbria (Coroners' Districts) Order 2007 (S.I. 2007/1165)
 Local Government Pension Scheme (Benefits, Membership and Contributions) Regulations 2007 (S.I. 2007/1166)
 Consumer Credit (Information Requirements and Duration of Licences and Charges) Regulations 2007 (S.I. 2007/1167)
 Consumer Credit (Exempt Agreements) Order 2007 (S.I. 2007/1168)
 National Assembly for Wales (Transfer of staff to Assembly Commission Scheme) Order 2007 (S.I. 2007/1169)
 Her Majesty's Inspectors of Constabulary (Specified Organisations) Order 2007 (S.I. 2007/1170)
 Government of Wales Act 2006 (Transitional Provisions) (Assembly General Subordinate Legislation) Order 2007 (S.I. 2007/1171)
 Her Majesty's Inspectorate of the National Probation Service for England and Wales (Specified Organisations) Order 2007 (S.I. 2007/1172)
 Her Majesty's Chief Inspector of Prisons (Specified Organisations) Order 2007 (S.I. 2007/1173)
 Criminal Defence Service (Funding) Order 2007 (S.I. 2007/1174)
 Social Security (Contributions) (Amendment No. 3) Regulations 2007 (S.I. 2007/1175)
 Majesty's Inspectorate of Court Administration (Specified Organisations) Order 2007 (S.I. 2007/1176)
 Justices of the Peace (Training and Appraisal) (Amendment) Rules 2007 (S.I. 2007/1177)
 Learning and Skills Council for England (Supplementary Functions) Order 2007 (S.I. 2007/1178)
 Health Act 1999 (Commencement No. 16) Order 2007 (S.I. 2007/1179)
 Dissolution of the Post Office Order 2007 (S.I. 2007/1180)
 Postal Services Act 2000 (Commencement No. 5) Order 2007 (S.I. 2007/1181)
 Government of Wales Act 2006 (Local Government (Contracts) Act 1997) (Modifications) Order 2007 (S.I. 2007/1182)
 Flexible Working (Eligibility, Complaints and Remedies) (Amendment) Regulations 2007 (S.I. 2007/1184)
 Derwentside (Parish) Order 2007 (S.I. 2007/1185)

1201-1300

 NHS Business Services Authority (Awdurdod Gwasanaethau Busnes y GIG) (Establishment and Constitution) Amendment Order 2007 (S.I. 2007/1201)
 A14 Trunk Road (Haughley New Street to Stowmarket Improvement and Detrunking) Order 2007 (S.I. 2007/1250)
 Constitutional Reform Act 2005 (Commencement No. 9) Order 2007 (S.I. 2007/1252)
 Lasting Powers of Attorney, Enduring Powers of Attorney and Public Guardian Regulations S.I. 2007/1253)
 Commonhold and Leasehold Reform Act 2002 (Commencement No. 6) (England) Order 2007 (S.I. 2007/1256)
 Service Charges (Summary of Rights and Obligations, and Transitional Provision) (England) Regulations 2007 (S.I. 2007/1257)
 Administration Charges (Summary of Rights and Obligations) (England) Regulations 2007 (S.I. 2007/1258)
 Equality Act (Sexual Orientation) Regulations 2007 (S.I. 2007/1263)
 Education (Supply of Information about the School Workforce) (England) Regulations 2007 (S.I. 2007/1264)
 National Savings Bank (Amendment) Regulations 2007 (S.I. 2007/1265)
 North Cumbria Mental Health and Learning Disabilities National Health Service Trust (Change of Name) (Establishment) Amendment Order 2007 (S.I. 2007/1267)
 Primary Care Trusts (Establishment and Dissolution) (England) Amendment Order 2007 (S.I. 2007/1268)
 National Assembly for Wales (Transfer of Property, Rights and Liabilities) Order 2007 (S.I. 2007/1269)
 Government of Wales Act 2006 (Transitional Provisions) Order 2007 (S.I. 2007/1270)
 Education and Inspections Act 2006 (Commencement No. 4 and Transitional Provisions and Amendment) Order 2007 (S.I. 2007/1271)
 Health Professions Council (Registration and Fees) (Amendment) Rules Order of Council 2007 (S.I. 2007/1280)
 Wireless Telegraphy (Radio Frequency Identification Equipment) (Exemption) (Amendment) Regulations 2007 (S.I. 2007/1282)
 Local Authorities (Functions and Responsibilities) (England) (Amendment) Regulations 2007 (S.I. 2007/1284)
 Special Immigration Appeals Commission (Procedure) (Amendment) Rules 2007 (S.I. 2007/1285)
 Proscribed Organisations Appeal Commission (Procedure) Rules 2007 (S.I. 2007/1286)
 School Organisation (Requirements as to Foundations) (England) Regulations 2007 (S.I. 2007/1287)
 School Organisation (Establishment and Discontinuance of Schools) (England) Regulations 2007 (S.I. 2007/1288)
 School Organisation (Prescribed Alterations to Maintained Schools) (England) Regulations 2007 (S.I. 2007/1289)
 Courts-Martial Appeal (Amendment No. 2) Rules 2007 (S.I. 2007/1298)

1301-1400

 Education (Excluded Days of Detention) (England) Regulations 2007 (S.I. 2007/1304)
 Tax Credits (Definition and Calculation of Income) (Amendment) Regulations 2007 (S.I. 2007/1305)
 Veterinary Surgery (Artificial Insemination) Order 2007 (S.I. 2007/1315)
 Jobseeker's Allowance (Extension of the Intensive Activity Period) Amendment Regulations 2007 (S.I. 2007/1316)
 Community Legal Service (Asylum and Immigration Appeals) (Amendment) Regulations 2007 (S.I. 2007/1317)
 Legal Aid (Asylum and Immigration Appeals) (Northern Ireland) Regulations 2007 (S.I. 2007/1318)
 Bovine Semen (England) Regulations 2007 (S.I. 2007/1319)
 Health Service Medicines (Information Relating to Sales of Branded Medicines etc.) Regulations 2007 (S.I. 2007/1320)
 Collaboration Arrangements (Maintained Schools and Further Education Bodies) (England) Regulations 2007 (S.I. 2007/1321)
 Capital Expenditure in respect of Voluntary Aided Schools (England) Regulations 2007 (S.I. 2007/1322)
 Transport for London (Knightsbridge Station) Order 2007 (S.I. 2007/1323)
 Firearms (Sentencing) (Transitory Provisions) Order 2007 (S.I. 2007/1324)
 School Organisation (Foundation Special Schools) (Application of Provisions Relating to Foundations) (England) Regulations 2007 (S.I. 2007/1329)
 School Governance (Parent Council) (England) Regulations 2007 (S.I. 2007/1330)
 Social Security, Housing Benefit and Council Tax Benefit (Miscellaneous Amendments) Regulations 2007 (S.I. 2007/1331)
 Health and Safety at Work etc. Act 1974 (Application to Environmentally Hazardous Substances) (Amendment) Regulations 2007 (S.I. 2007/1332)
 Export Control (North Korea) Order 2007 (S.I. 2007/1334)
 Local Probation Boards (Miscellaneous Provisions) (Amendment) Regulations 2007 (S.I. 2007/1335)
 Education (Student Fees, Awards and Support) (Amendment) Regulations 2007 (S.I. 2007/1336)
 Financial Services and Markets Act 2000 (Regulated Activities) (Amendment) Order 2007 (S.I. 2007/1339)
 North Korea (United Nations Measures) (Overseas Territories) (Amendment) Order 2007 (S.I. 2007/1347)
 Veterinary Surgeons' Qualifications (European Recognition) Order 2007 (S.I. 2007/1348)
 European Communities (Designation) (No. 2) Order 2007 (S.I. 2007/1349)
 Naval, Military and Air Forces etc. (Disablement and Death) Service Pensions (Correction of 2004 Uprating) Order 2007 (S.I. 2007/1350)
 Safeguarding Vulnerable Groups (Northern Ireland) Order 2007 (S.I. 2007/1351)
 Inspectors of Education, Children's Services and Skills (No. 2) Order 2007 (S.I. 2007/1352)
 National Assembly for Wales Commission (Crown Status) (No. 2) Order 2007 (S.I. 2007/1353)
 Scottish Parliamentary Elections (Returning Officers' Charges) Order 2007 (S.I. 2007/1354)
 School Organisation (Transitional Provisions) (England) Regulations 2007 (S.I. 2007/1355)
 Housing Benefit (Amendment) Regulations 2007 (S.I. 2007/1356)
 Local Authority Adoption Service (Wales) Regulations 2007 (S.I. 2007/1357)
 Exempt Charities (No. 2) Order 2007 (S.I. 2007/1364)
 Education (School Information) (England) (Amendment) Regulations 2007 (S.I. 2007/1365)
 School Travel (Piloting of Schemes) (England) Regulations 2007 (S.I. 2007/1366)
 School Travel (Pupils with Dual Registration) (England) Regulations 2007 (S.I. 2007/1367)
 Representation of the People (National Assembly for Wales) (Access to Election Documents) Regulations 2007 (S.I. 2007/1368)
 Planning and Compulsory Purchase Act 2004 (Commencement No. 10 and Saving) Order 2007 (S.I. 2007/1369)
 Designation of Schools Having a Religious Character (Independent Schools) (England) Order 2007 (S.I. 2007/1370)
 Rules of the Air (Amendment) Regulations 2007 (S.I. 2007/1371)
 Representation of the People (National Assembly for Wales) (Relevant Registration Officer) Order 2007 (S.I. 2007/1372)
 Iran (European Community Financial Sanctions) Regulations 2007 (S.I. 2007/1374)
 Health Act 2006 (Commencement No. 3) Order 2007 (S.I. 2007/1375)
 Finance Act 2003, Section 66 (Prescribed Statutory Provisions) Order 2007 (S.I. 2007/1385)
 Medical Act 1983 (Qualifying Examinations) Order 2007 (S.I. 2007/1386)
 Serious Organised Crime and Police Act 2005 (Designated Sites under Section 128) (Amendment) Order 2007 (S.I. 2007/1387)
 Government of Wales Act 2006 (Consequential Modifications and Transitional Provisions) Order 2007 (S.I. 2007/1388)
 Serious Organised Crime and Police Act 2005 (Amendment of Section 76(3)) Order 2007 (S.I. 2007/1392)
 Northern Ireland Act 2000 (Restoration of Devolved Government) Order 2007 (S.I. 2007/1397)
 Transfer of State Pensions and Benefits Regulations 2007 (S.I. 2007/1398)

1401-1500

 Walkergate Primary School (Change to School Session Times) Order 2007 (S.I. 2007/1408)
 Gambling Act 2005 (Mandatory and Default Conditions) (England and Wales) Regulations 2007 (S.I. 2007/1409)
 Gambling Act 2005 (Exclusion of Children from Track Areas) Order 2007 (S.I. 2007/1410)
 Football Spectators (2007 European Under-21 Championship Control Period) Order 2007 (S.I. 2007/1411)
 Luton and South Bedfordshire Joint Committee Order 2007 (S.I. 2007/1412)
 Local Authority Targets (Well-Being of Young Children) Regulations 2007 (S.I. 2007/1415)
 Hydrocarbon Oil (Marking) (Amendment) Regulations 2007 (S.I. 2007/1416)
 Value Added Tax (Section 55A) (Specified Goods and Excepted Supplies) Order 2007 (S.I. 2007/1417)
 Value Added Tax (Amendment) (No. 3) Regulations 2007 (S.I. 2007/1418)
 Finance Act 2006, section 19, (Appointed Day) Order 2007 (S.I. 2007/1419)
 Value Added Tax (Payments on Account) (Amendment) Order 2007 (S.I. 2007/1420)
 Value Added Tax (Administration, Collection and Enforcement) Order 2007 (S.I. 2007/1421)
 Registration of Births, Deaths and Marriages (Amendment) Regulations 2007 (S.I. 2007/1422)
 Brighton West Pier Harbour Revision Order 2007 (S.I. 2007/1423)
 Motor Vehicles (Compulsory Insurance) Regulations 2007 (S.I. 2007/1426)
 Dangerous Wild Animals Act 1976 (Modification) Order 2007 (S.I. 2007/1437)
 Mersey Docks and Harbour Company (Seaforth River Terminal) Harbour Revision Order 2007 (S.I. 2007/1440)
 Local Authorities (Contracting Out of Anti-social Behaviour Order Functions) (England) Order 2007 (S.I. 2007/1441)
 Armed Forces Act 2006 (Commencement No. 1) Order 2007 (S.I. 2007/1442)
 Public Health (Ships) (Amendment) (England) Regulations 2007 (S.I. 2007/1446)
 Public Health (Aircraft) (Amendment) (England) Regulations 2007 (S.I. 2007/1447)
 Assistants to Justices' Clerks (Amendment) Regulations 2007 (S.I. 2007/1448)
 Marketing of Vegetable Plant Material (England) (Amendment) Regulations 2007 (S.I. 2007/1449)
 Oil Taxation (Nomination Scheme for Disposals) (Amendment) Regulations 2007 (S.I. 2007/1454)
 Citizenship Oath and Pledge (Welsh Language) Order 2007 (S.I. 2007/1484)
 Local Government Pension Scheme (Amendment) (No. 2) Regulations 2007 (S.I. 2007/1488)
 Whole of Government Accounts (Designation of Bodies) Order 2007 (S.I. 2007/1492)
 Countryside and Rights of Way Act 2000 (Commencement No. 12) Order 2007 (S.I. 2007/1493)
 Highways (SSSI Diversion Orders) (England) Regulations 2007 (S.I. 2007/1494)
 Disability Discrimination Code of Practice (Providers of Post 16 Education) (Revocation) Order 2007 (S.I. 2007/1495)
 Disability Discrimination Code of Practice (Providers of Post 16 Education) (Appointed Day) Order 2007 (S.I. 2007/1496)

1501-1600

 Education Act 1996 (Amendment of Section 19) (England) Regulations 2007 (S.I. 2007/1507)
 Goods Infringing the Olympics and Paralympics Association Rights (Customs) Regulations 2007 (S.I. 2007/1508)
 Control of Cash (Penalties) Regulations 2007 (S.I. 2007/1509)
 National Health Service (Charges for Drugs and Appliances) Amendment (No. 2) Regulations 2007 (S.I. 2007/1510)
 Road Traffic (Permitted Parking Area and Special Parking Area) (Metropolitan Borough of North Tyneside) Order 2007 (S.I. 2007/1511)
 Bus Lane Contraventions (Approved Local Authorities) (England) (Amendment) (No. 3) Order 2007 (S.I. 2007/1512)
 Marine Works (Environmental Impact Assessment) Regulations 2007 (S.I. 2007/1518)
 Planning and Compulsory Purchase Act 2004 (Corresponding Amendments) Order 2007 (S.I. 2007/1519)
 Road Tunnel Safety Regulations 2007 (S.I. 2007/1520)
 Human Fertilisation and Embryology (Quality and Safety) Regulations 2007 (S.I. 2007/1522)
 Human Tissue (Quality and Safety for Human Application) Regulations 2007 (S.I. 2007/1523)
 Street Litter Control Notices (England) (Amendment) Order 2007 (S.I. 2007/1524)
 Home Information Pack (Revocation) Regulations 2007 (S.I. 2007/1525)
 Export Control (Iran) Order 2007 (S.I. 2007/1526)
 Gambling Act 2005 (Commencement No. 6 and Transitional Provisions) (Amendment) Order 2007 (S.I. 2007/1527)
 Home Information Pack (Redress Scheme) (Revocation) Order 2007 (S.I. 2007/1536)
 Offshore Installations (Safety Zones) (No. 3) Order 2007 (S.I. 2007/1549)
 Electronic Commerce Directive (Terrorism Act 2006) Regulations 2007 (S.I. 2007/1550)
 Commons Registration (General) (Amendment) (England) (Revocation) Regulations 2007 (S.I. 2007/1553)
 St Mary's (Isles of Scilly) Harbour Revision Order 2007 (S.I. 2007/1554)
 Disability Discrimination Act 2005 (Commencement No. 3) Order 2007 (S.I. 2007/1555)
 National Institutions of the Church of England (Transfer of Functions) Order 2007 (S.I. 2007/1556)
 Local Authorities (Functions and Responsibilities) (England) (Amendment) (No. 2) Regulations 2007 (S.I. 2007/1557)
 Local Government Pension Scheme (Amendment) (No. 3) Regulations 2007 (S.I. 2007/1561)
 Carriage of Dangerous Goods and Use of Transportable Pressure Equipment Regulations 2007 (S.I. 2007/1573)
 A404 Trunk Road (Handy Cross Junction Improvement) (Derestriction) Order 2007 (S.I. 2007/1574)
 A404 Trunk Road (Maidenhead Thicket to Handy Cross) (24 Hours Clearway) Order 2007 (S.I. 2007/1575)
 Road Traffic (Permitted Parking Area and Special Parking Area) (County of Leicestershire) Order 2007 (S.I. 2007/1582)
 Road Traffic (Permitted Parking Area and Special Parking Area) (Metropolitan Borough of Gateshead) Order 2007 (S.I. 2007/1583)
 Road Traffic (Permitted Parking Area and Special Parking Area) (South Gloucestershire) Order 2007 (S.I. 2007/1584)
 Bus Lane Contraventions (Approved Local Authorities) (England) (Amendment) (No. 4) Order 2007 (S.I. 2007/1585)
 Safety of Sports Grounds (Designation) Order 2007 (S.I. 2007/1587)
 Railways Pensions Guarantee (Prescribed Persons) Order 2007 (S.I. 2007/1595)
 Controls on Dangerous Substances and Preparations (Amendment) Regulations 2007 (S.I. 2007/1596)
 Sex Discrimination Code of Practice (Public Authorities) (Duty to Promote Equality, Scotland) (Appointed Day) Order 2007 (S.I. 2007/1597)
 Integration Loans for Refugees and Others Regulations 2007 (S.I. 2007/1598)
 Value Added Tax (Amendment) (No. 4) Regulations 2007 (S.I. 2007/1599)
 Pension Schemes (Categories of Country and Requirements for Overseas Pension Schemes and Recognised Overseas Pension Schemes) (Amendment) Regulations 2007 (S.I. 2007/1600)

1601-1700

 Value Added Tax (Reduced Rate) Order 2007 (S.I. 2007/1601)
 Asylum and Immigration (Treatment of Claimants, etc.) Act 2004 (Commencement No. 7 and Transitional Provisions) Order 2007 (S.I. 2007/1602)
 Public Health (Aircraft and Ships) (Amendment) (England) Regulations 2007 (S.I. 2007/1603)
 Products of Animal Origin (Third Country Imports) (England) (Amendment) Regulations 2007 (S.I. 2007/1605)
 Motor Fuel (Composition and Content) (Amendment) Regulations 2007 (S.I. 2007/1608)
 Justices of the Peace (Training and Development Committee) Rules 2007 (S.I. 2007/1609)
 Family Proceedings Courts (Constitution of Committees and Right to Preside) Rules 2007 (S.I. 2007/1610)
 Youth Courts (Constitution of Committees and Right to Preside) Rules 2007 (S.I. 2007/1611)
 Representation of the People (Northern Ireland)(Amendment) Regulations 2007 (S.I. 2007/1612)
 Personal Injuries (NHS Charges) (Reviews and Appeals) Amendment Regulations 2007 (S.I. 2007/1613)
 Police and Justice Act 2006 (Commencement No. 3) Order 2007 (S.I. 2007/1614)
 Spreadable Fats (Marketing Standards) (England) (Amendment) Regulations 2007 (S.I. 2007/1615)
 Finance Act 1994, Section 220 (Amendment) Regulations 2007 (S.I. 2007/1616)
 Housing Benefit and Council Tax Benefit (War Pension Disregards) Regulations 2007 (S.I. 2007/1619)
 Animals and Animal Products (Import and Export) (England) (Laboratories, Circuses and Avian Quarantine) Regulations 2007 (S.I. 2007/1621)
 Family Proceedings (Amendment) Rules 2007 (S.I. 2007/1622)
 Cosmetic Products (Safety) (Amendment) Regulations 2007 (S.I. 2007/1623)
 Health Protection Agency (Amendment) Regulations 2007 (S.I. 2007/1624)
 Register of Occupational and Personal Pension Schemes (Amendment) Regulations 2007 (S.I. 2007/1625)
 Social Security (Miscellaneous Amendments) (No. 2) Regulations 2007 (S.I. 2007/1626)
 Animals and Animal Products (Import and Export) (Wales) (Laboratories, Circuses and Avian Quarantine) Regulations 2007 (S.I. 2007/1627)
 Family Proceedings Courts (Matrimonial Proceedings etc.) (Amendment) Rules 2007 (S.I. 2007/1628)
 Education (Mandatory Awards) (Amendment) Regulations 2007 (S.I. 2007/1629)
 Education (Student Loans) (Amendment) (England and Wales) Regulations 2007 (S.I. 2007/1630)
 Addition of Vitamins, Minerals and Other Substances (England) Regulations 2007 (S.I. 2007/1631)
 Social Security (Students and Income-related Benefits) Amendment Regulations 2007 (S.I. 2007/1632)
 Biofuels and Other Fuel Substitutes (Payment of Excise Duties etc.) (Amendment) Regulations 2007 (S.I. 2007/1640)
 Civil Jurisdiction and Judgments Regulations 2007 (S.I. 2007/1655)
 Home Information Pack (No. 2) Regulations 2007 (S.I. 2007/1667)
 Housing Act 2004 (Commencement No. 8) (England and Wales) Order 2007 (S.I. 2007/1668)
 Energy Performance of Buildings (Certificates and Inspections) (England and Wales) (Amendment) Regulations 2007 (S.I. 2007/1669)
 Financial Assistance for Environmental Purposes Order 2007 (S.I. 2007/1671)
 Health and Safety (Fees) (Amendment) Regulations 2007 (S.I. 2007/1672)
 Technology Strategy Board (Transfer of Property etc.) Order 2007 (S.I. 2007/1676)
 Virgin Islands Constitution Order 2007 (S.I. 2007/1678)
 European Communities (Designation) (No. 3) Order 2007 (S.I. 2007/1679)
 Parliamentary Constituencies (England) Order 2007 (S.I. 2007/1681)
 Education (Student Loans) (Repayment) (Amendment) Regulations 2007 (S.I. 2007/1683)
 Protection of Children and Vulnerable Adults and Care Standards Tribunal (Amendment) Regulations 2007 (S.I. 2007/1684)
 Education (School Teachers' Pay and Conditions) (No. 2) (Amendment) Order 2007 (S.I. 2007/1688)

1701-1800

 Poultry Breeding Flocks and Hatcheries (Wales) Order 2007 (S.I. 2007/1708)
 Secure Training Centre (Amendment) Rules 2007 (S.I. 2007/1709)
 Products of Animal Origin (Third Country Imports) (Wales) (Amendment) Regulations 2007 (S.I. 2007/1710)
 Transfrontier Shipment of Waste Regulations 2007 (S.I. 2007/1711)
 Traffic Management (Guidance on Intervention Criteria) (Wales) Order 2007 (S.I. 2007/1712)
 Street Works (Inspection Fees) (Wales) (Amendment) Regulations 2007 (S.I. 2007/1713)
 North/South Co-operation (Implementation Bodies) (Amendment) (Northern Ireland) Order 2007 (S.I. 2007/1719)
 Education (Outturn Statements) (England) Regulations 2007 (S.I. 2007/1720)
 Welfare Reform Act 2007 Commencement (No. 1) Order 2007 (S.I. 2007/1721)
 Road Traffic (Permitted Parking Area and Special Parking area) (City of Manchester) (Amendment) Order 2007 (S.I. 2007/1736)
 Town and Country Planning (Control of Advertisements) (England) (Amendment) Regulations 2007 (S.I. 2007/1739)
 REACH (Appointment of Competent Authorities) Regulations 2007 (S.I. 2007/1742)
 Primary Care Trusts (Establishment and Dissolution) (England) Amendment (No. 2) Order 2007 (S.I. 2007/1743)
 Court of Protection Rules 2007 (S.I. 2007/1744)
 Court of Protection Fees Order 2007 (S.I. 2007/1745)
 Spelthorne College, Ashford, Middlesex (Dissolution) Order 2007 (S.I. 2007/1746)
 Skelmersdale College (Dissolution) Order 2007 (S.I. 2007/1747)
 North Trafford College of Further Education (Dissolution) Order 2007 (S.I. 2007/1748)
 Social Security (Miscellaneous Amendments) (No. 3) Regulations 2007 (S.I. 2007/1749)
 Home Loss Payments (Prescribed Amounts) (England) Regulations 2007 (S.I. 2007/1750)
 Farnham College (Dissolution) Order 2007 (S.I. 2007/1751)
 Cricklade College, Andover (Dissolution) Order 2007 (S.I. 2007/1752)
 Social Security (Industrial Injuries) (Prescribed Diseases) Amendment (No. 2) Regulations 2007 (S.I. 2007/1753)
 Keighley College (Dissolution) Order 2007 (S.I. 2007/1754)
 Bovine Products (Restriction on Placing on the Market) (England) (No. 2) (Amendment) Regulations 2007 (S.I. 2007/1755)
 Lord Chancellor (Modification of Functions) Order 2007 (S.I. 2007/1756)
 Criminal Justice Act 2003 (Reviews of Sentencing) (Consequential and Supplementary Provisions) Order 2007 (S.I. 2007/1762)
 Plant Health (Import Inspection Fees) (Wales) (Amendment) Regulations 2007 (S.I. 2007/1763)
 Disability Discrimination (General Qualifications Bodies)(Relevant Qualifications, Reasonable Steps and Physical Features) Regulations 2007 (S.I. 2007/1764)
 Plant Health (Plant Passport Fees) (Wales) Regulations 2007 (S.I. 2007/1765)
 NHS Foundation Trusts (Trust Funds: Appointment of Trustees) Order 2007 (S.I. 2007/1766)
 Veterinary Surgery (Artificial Insemination) (Amendment) Order 2007 (S.I. 2007/1767)
 Digital Switchover (Disclosure of Information) Act 2007 (Prescription of Information) Order 2007 (S.I. 2007/1768)
 Day Care and Child Minding (Registration Fees) (England) (Amendment) Regulations 2007 (S.I. 2007/1769)
 Public Guardian Board Regulations 2007 (S.I. 2007/1770)
 Early Years Foundation Stage (Welfare Requirements) Regulations 2007 (S.I. 2007/1771)
 Early Years Foundation Stage (Learning and Development Requirements) Order 2007 (S.I. 2007/1772)
 Gambling Act 2005 (Premises Licences and Provisional Statements) (Amendment) (England and Wales) Regulations 2007 (S.I. 2007/1775)
 Gambling Act 2005 (Limits on Prize Gaming) Regulations 2007 (S.I. 2007/1777)
 Miscellaneous Food Additives and the Sweeteners in Food (Amendment) (England) Regulations 2007 (S.I. 2007/1778)
 Urban Regeneration Agency (London Development Agency) Transfer Scheme 2000 (Modification) Order 2007 (S.I. 2007/1789)
 Railways (North and West London Lines) Exemption Order 2007 (S.I. 2007/1790)
 Gambling (Operating Licence and Single-Machine Permit Fees) (Amendment) (No. 2) Regulations 2007 (S.I. 2007/1791)
 Children Act 2004 (Director of Children's Services) Appointed Day Order 2007 (S.I. 2007/1792)
 Pershore Group of Colleges (Dissolution) Order 2007 (S.I. 2007/1793)
 Pershore Group of Colleges (Designated Staff) Order 2007 (S.I. 2007/1794)
 Childcare Providers (Information, Advice and Training) Regulations 2007 (S.I. 2007/1797)

1801-1900

 Education and Inspections Act 2006 (Commencement No. 5 and Saving Provisions) Order 2007 (S.I. 2007/1801)
 Associated British Ports (Immingham Gas Jetty) Harbour Revision Order 2007 (S.I. 2007/1803)
 Road Vehicles (Construction and Use) (Amendment) Regulations 2007 (S.I. 2007/1817)
 National Health Service (Functions of Strategic Health Authorities and Primary Care Trusts and Administration Arrangements) (England) (Amendment No.2) Regulations 2007 (S.I. 2007/1818)
 Community Drivers' Hours and Recording Equipment Regulations 2007 (S.I. 2007/1819)
 Income Tax Act 2007 (Amendment) (No. 2) Order 2007 (S.I. 2007/1820)
 Financial Services and Markets Act 2000 (Exemption) (Amendment No. 2) Order 2007 (S.I. 2007/1821)
 Humber Bridge (Debts) Order 2007 (S.I. 2007/1828)
 Crime Prevention (Designated Areas) Order 2007 (S.I. 2007/1829)
 Crime and Disorder (Formulation and Implementation of Strategy) Regulations 2007 (S.I. 2007/1830)
 Crime and Disorder (Prescribed Information) Regulations 2007 (S.I. 2007/1831)
 Gaming Machines in Alcohol Licensed Premises (Notification Fee) (England and Wales) Regulations 2007 (S.I. 2007/1832)
 Gambling Act 2005 (Licensed Premises Gaming Machine Permits) (England and Wales) Regulations 2007 (S.I. 2007/1833)
 Gambling Act 2005 (Club Gaming and Club Machine Permits) Regulations 2007 (S.I. 2007/1834)
 Bovine Products (Restriction on Placing on the Market) (Wales) (No. 2) (Amendment) Regulations 2007 (S.I. 2007/1835)
 Education (National Curriculum) (Foundation Stage Early Learning Goals) (England) (Amendment) Order 2007 (S.I. 2007/1836)
 Time Off for Public Duties (Parent Councils) Order 2007 (S.I. 2007/1837)
 Social Security (Contributions) (Amendment No. 4) Regulations 2007 (S.I. 2007/1838)
 Crime and Disorder Act 1998 (Responsible Authorities) (No. 2) Order 2007 (S.I. 2007/1839)
 Crime and Disorder Strategies (Prescribed Descriptions) (England) (Amendment) Order 2007 (S.I. 2007/1840)
 Education (National Curriculum) (Attainment Targets and Programmes of Study in English) (England) (Amendment) Order 2007 (S.I. 2007/1841)
 Offshore Marine Conservation (Natural Habitats, &c.) Regulations 2007 (S.I. 2007/1842)
 Conservation (Natural Habitats, &c.) (Amendment) Regulations 2007 (S.I. 2007/1843)
 Town and Country Planning (General Development Procedure) (Amendment) (England) Order 2007 (S.I. 2007/1844)
 Domestic Violence, Crime and Victims Act 2004 (Commencement No. 9 and Transitional Provisions) Order 2007 (S.I. 2007/1845)
 EC Competition Law (Articles 84 and 85) Enforcement (Revocation) Regulations 2007 (S.I. 2007/1846)
 Electoral Administration Act 2006 (Commencement No. 4 and Transitional Provision) Order 2007 (S.I. 2007/1847)
 Cumbria Institute of the Arts Higher Education Corporation (Dissolution) Order 2007 (S.I. 2007/1848)
 Disability Discrimination Act 1995 (Amendment) (Further Education) Regulations 2007 (S.I. 2007/1849)
 Armed Forces (Alignment of Service Discipline Acts) Order 2007 (S.I. 2007/1859)
 Education (Special Educational Needs) (England) (Consolidation) (Amendment) Regulations 2007 (S.I. 2007/1860)
 Armed Forces (Service Police Amendments) Order 2007 (S.I. 2007/1861)
 Stonebridge Housing Action Trust (Dissolution) Order 2007 (S.I. 2007/1862)
 Export and Trade Control Order 2007 (S.I. 2007/1863)
 Further Education (Principals' Qualifications) (England) Regulations 2007 (S.I. 2007/1864)
 Student Fees (Amounts) (England) (Amendment) Regulations 2007 (S.I. 2007/1865)
 Social Security (Claims and Payments) Amendment (No. 2) Regulations 2007 (S.I. 2007/1866)
 Education (Penalty Notices) (England) Regulations 2007 (S.I. 2007/1867)
 Education (Reintegration Interview) (England) Regulations 2007 (S.I. 2007/1868)
 Education (Parenting Contracts and Parenting Orders) (England) Regulations 2007 (S.I. 2007/1869)
 Education (Provision of Full-Time Education for Excluded Pupils) (England) Regulations 2007 (S.I. 2007/1870)
 Seeds (National Lists of Varieties) (Amendment) Regulations 2007 (S.I. 2007/1871)
 Seed (Miscellaneous Amendments) (England) Regulations 2007 (S.I. 2007/1872)
 General Teaching Council for England (Registration of Teachers) (Amendment) Regulations 2007 (S.I. 2007/1883)
 General Dental Council (Overseas Registration Examination Regulations) Order of Council 2007 (S.I. 2007/1884)
 Nursing and Midwifery Council (Fees) (Amendment) Rules Order of Council 2007 (S.I. 2007/1885)
 Medical Act 1983 Amendments (Transitional Provisions Relating to Postgraduate Training) Order of Council 2007 (S.I. 2007/1886)
 Nursing and Midwifery Council (Midwives) (Amendment) Rules Order of Council 2007 (S.I. 2007/1887)
 Regulatory Reform (Collaboration etc. between Ombudsmen) Order 2007 (S.I. 2007/1889)
 Traffic Management Act 2004 (Commencement No. 4 and Transitional Provisions) (England) Order 2007 (S.I. 2007/1890)
 Police Act 1997 (Criminal Records) (Amendment No. 2) Regulations 2007 (S.I. 2007/1892)
 Plant Health (England) (Amendment) Order 2007 (S.I. 2007/1893)
 Coal Mines (Control of Inhalable Dust) Regulations 2007 (S.I. 2007/1894)
 Civil Aviation (Access to Air Travel for Disabled Persons and Persons with Reduced Mobility) Regulations 2007 (S.I. 2007/1895)
 Competition Act 1998 (Public Policy Exclusion) Order 2007 (S.I. 2007/1896)
 Mental Capacity Act 2005 (Commencement No. 2) Order 2007 (S.I. 2007/1897)
 Mental Capacity Act 2005 (Transitional and Consequential Provisions) Order 2007 (S.I. 2007/1898)
 Mental Capacity Act 2005 (Transfer Of Proceedings) Order 2007 (S.I. 2007/1899)
 Public Health (Aircraft) (Amendment) (Wales) Regulations 2007 (S.I. 2007/1900)

1901-2000

 Public Health (Ships) (Amendment) (Wales) Regulations 2007 (S.I. 2007/1901)
 Road Traffic (Permitted Parking Area and Special Parking Area) (County of North Yorkshire) (Borough of Scarborough) Order 2007 (S.I. 2007/1902)
 Licensing and Management of Houses in Multiple Occupation (Additional Provisions) (England) Regulations 2007 (S.I. 2007/1903)
 Houses in Multiple Occupation (Certain Converted Blocks of Flats) (Modifications to the Housing Act 2004 and Transitional Provisions for section 257 HMOs) (England) Regulations 2007 (S.I. 2007/1904)
 Spreadable Fats (Marketing Standards) (Wales) (Amendment) Regulations 2007 (S.I. 2007/1905)
 Air Navigation (Restriction of Flying) (Nuclear Installations) Regulations 2007 (S.I. 2007/1929)
 Occupational Pension Schemes (Winding Up, Winding Up Notices and Reports etc.) (Amendment) Regulations 2007 (S.I. 2007/1930)
 Vaccine Damage Payments Act 1979 Statutory Sum Order 2007 (S.I. 2007/1931)
 Police Pension Fund Regulations 2007 (S.I. 2007/1932)
 Mobile Roaming (European Communities) Regulations 2007 (S.I. 2007/1933)
 Road Traffic (Permitted Parking Area and Special Parking Area) (County of Northamptonshire) (Corby, Wellingborough, East Northamptonshire and South Northamptonshire) Order 2007 (S.I. 2007/1934)
 Road Traffic (Permitted Parking Area and Special Parking Area) (County of Warwickshire) (District of Warwick) Order 2007 (S.I. 2007/1935)
 Gambling Act 2005 (Exempt Gaming in Alcohol-Licensed Premises) Regulations 2007 (S.I. 2007/1940)
 Plant Protection Products (Amendment) (No. 2) Regulations 2007 (S.I. 2007/1941)
 Gambling Act 2005 (Gaming in Clubs) Regulations 2007 (S.I. 2007/1942)
 Common Agricultural Policy (Wine) (England and Northern Ireland) (Amendment) Regulations 2007 (S.I. 2007/1943)
 Gambling Act 2005 (Exempt Gaming in Clubs) Regulations 2007 (S.I. 2007/1944)
 Gambling Act 2005 (Club Gaming Permits) (Authorised Gaming) Regulations 2007 (S.I. 2007/1945)
 Home Information Pack (Redress Scheme) (No. 2) Order 2007 (S.I. 2007/1946)
 Company and Business Names (Amendment) Regulations 2007 (S.I. 2007/1947)
 Electricity (Offshore Generating Stations) (Safety Zones) (Application Procedures and Control of Access) Regulations 2007 (S.I. 2007/1948)
 European Grouping of Territorial Cooperation Regulations 2007 (S.I. 2007/1949)
 Local Authorities (Functions and Responsibilities) (England) (Amendment No. 3) Regulations 2007 (S.I. 2007/1950)
 Street Works (Registers, Notices, Directions and Designations) (England) Regulations 2007 (S.I. 2007/1951)
 Street Works (Fixed Penalty) (England) Regulations 2007 (S.I. 2007/1952)
 Gas (Applications for Licences and Extensions and Restrictions of Licences) Regulations 2007 (S.I. 2007/1971)
 Electricity (Applications for Licences, Modifications of an Area and Extensions and Restrictions of Licences) Regulations 2007 (S.I. 2007/1972)
 Regulatory Reform (Financial Services and Markets Act 2000) Order 2007 (S.I. 2007/1973)
 Insolvency (Amendment) Rules 2007 (S.I. 2007/1974)
 National Health Service (Charges for Drugs and Appliances) and (Travel Expenses and Remission of Charges) Amendment Regulations 2007 (S.I. 2007/1975)
 Trade Marks (Relative Grounds) Order 2007 (S.I. 2007/1976)
 Electricity Works (Environmental Impact Assessment) (England and Wales) (Amendment) Regulations 2007 (S.I. 2007/1977)
 Akiva School (Designation as having a Religious Character) Order 2007 (S.I. 2007/1978)
 Child Support (Miscellaneous Amendments) Regulations 2007 (S.I. 2007/1979)
 Archbishop Cranmer Church of England Primary School (Designation as having a Religious Character) Order 2007 (S.I. 2007/1980)
 Bolton Muslim Girls School (Designation as having a Religious Character) Order 2007 (S.I. 2007/1982)
 Holy Family Roman Catholic and Church of England College (Designation as having a Religious Character) Order 2007 (S.I. 2007/1983)
 Addition of Vitamins, Minerals and Other Substances (Wales) Regulations 2007 (S.I. 2007/1984)
 Our Lady Star of the Sea Catholic Primary School (Designation as having a Religious Character) Order 2007 (S.I. 2007/1985)
 Rosary Catholic Primary School (Designation as having a Religious Character) Order 2007 (S.I. 2007/1987)
 St Paul's C of E VA Primary School (Designation as having a Religious Character) Order 2007 (S.I. 2007/1988)
 Southminster Church of England Voluntary Controlled Primary School (Designation as having a Religious Character) Order 2007 (S.I. 2007/1989)
 Wilton and Barford CofE Primary School (Designation as having a Religious Character) Order 2007 (S.I. 2007/1990)
 Welfare Reform Act 2007 Commencement (No. 2) Order 2007 (S.I. 2007/1991)
 Pipe-line Works (Environmental Impact Assessment) (Amendment) Regulations 2007 (S.I. 2007/1992)
 Railways Act 2005 (Commencement No. 9) Order 2007 (S.I. 2007/1993)
 Gas Transporter Pipe-line Works (Environmental Impact Assessment) (Amendment) Regulations 2007 (S.I. 2007/1996)
 Transmissible Spongiform Encephalopathies (No. 2) (Amendment) Regulations 2007 (S.I. 2007/1998)
 Criminal Justice Act 2003 (Commencement No.16) Order 2007 (S.I. 2007/1999)
 Pneumoconiosis etc. (Workers' Compensation) (Prescribed Occupations) Order 2007 (S.I. 2007/2000)

2001-2100

 Education (Assisted Places) (Amendment) (England) Regulations 2007 (S.I. 2007/2001)
 Education (Assisted Places) (Incidental Expenses) (Amendment) (England) Regulations 2007 (S.I. 2007/2002)
 Heather and Grass etc. Burning (England) Regulations 2007 (S.I. 2007/2003)
 Reciprocal Enforcement of Maintenance Orders (United States of America) Order 2007 (S.I. 2007/2005)
 Recovery of Maintenance (United States of America) Order 2007 (S.I. 2007/2006)
 Regulatory Reform (Game) Order 2007 (S.I. 2007/2007)
 Rights of Way (Hearings and Inquiries Procedure) (England) Rules 2007 (S.I. 2007/2008)
 Patient Information Advisory Group (Establishment) (Amendment) Regulations 2007 (S.I. 2007/2009)
 Ecodesign for Energy-Using Products Regulations 2007 (S.I. 2007/2037)
 Football Spectators (Seating) Order 2007 (S.I. 2007/2038)
 Gambling Act 2005 (Incidental Non-Commercial Lotteries) Regulations 2007 (S.I. 2007/2040)
 Gambling Act 2005 (Non-Commercial Equal-Chance Gaming) Regulations 2007 (S.I. 2007/2041)
 National Minimum Wage Act 1998 (Amendment) Regulations 2007 (S.I. 2007/2042)
 Transmissible Spongiform Encephalopathies (Wales) (Amendment) Regulations 2007 (S.I. 2007/2043)
 Welsh Forms of Oaths and Affirmations (Government of Wales Act 2006) Order 2007 (S.I. 2007/2044)
 Justice and Security (Northern Ireland) Act 2007 (Commencement No.1 and Transitional Provisions) Order 2007 (S.I. 2007/2045)
 Education (Individual Pupil Information) (Prescribed Persons) (Amendment) Regulations 2007 (S.I. 2007/2050)
 Public Guardian (Fees, etc.) Regulations 2007 (S.I. 2007/2051)
 Police and Justice Act 2006 (Commencement No. 1) (Northern Ireland) Order 2007 (S.I. 2007/2052)
 Traffic Management Act 2004 (Commencement No. 5 and Transitional Provisions) (England) Order 2007 (S.I. 2007/2053)
 National Health Service Pension Scheme (Amendment) Regulations 2007 (S.I. 2007/2054)
 Social Security (Contributions) (Amendment No. 5) Regulations 2007 (S.I. 2007/2068)
 Income Tax (Pay as You Earn) (Amendment No. 2) Regulations 2007 (S.I. 2007/2069)
 Social Security Contributions (Managed Service Companies) Regulations 2007 (S.I. 2007/2070)
 Limited Liability Partnerships (Amendment) Regulations 2007 (S.I. 2007/2073)
 Zoonoses and Animal By-Products (Fees) (England) Regulations 2007 (S.I. 2007/2074)
 Licensing Act 2003 (Amendment of Schedule 4) Order 2007 (S.I. 2007/2075)
 Welfare of Farmed Animals (England) Regulations 2007 (S.I. 2007/2078)
 Working Time (Amendment) Regulations 2007 (S.I. 2007/2079)
 Nutrition and Health Claims (England) Regulations 2007 (S.I. 2007/2080)
 Companies (Political Expenditure Exemption) Order 2007 (S.I. 2007/2081)
 Wireless Telegraphy (Ultra-Wideband Equipment) (Exemption) Regulations 2007 (S.I. 2007/2084)
 Value Added Tax (Amendment) (No. 5) Regulations 2007 (S.I. 2007/2085)
 Insurance Companies (Overseas Life Assurance Business) (Excluded Business) (Amendment) Regulations 2007 (S.I. 2007/2086)
 Insurance Companies (Taxation of Reinsurance Business) (Amendment) Regulations 2007 (S.I. 2007/2087)
 Insurance Companies (Overseas Life Assurance Business) (Compliance) (Amendment) Regulations 2007 (S.I. 2007/2088)
 Local Authorities (Conduct of Referendums) (England) Regulations 2007 (S.I. 2007/2089)
 Excise Duties (Small Non-Commercial Consignments) Relief (Amendment) (Revocation) Regulations 2007 (S.I. 2007/2092)

2101-2200

 Gambling Act 2005 (Amendment of Schedule 6) Order 2007 (S.I. 2007/2101)
 Trinity College, Carmarthen (Designated Institutions in Higher Education) (Wales) Order 2007 (S.I. 2007/2112)
 Further Education Teachers' Continuing Professional Development and Registration (England) Regulations 2007 (S.I. 2007/2116)
 Education (Specified Work and Registration) (England) (Amendment) Regulations 2007 (S.I. 2007/2117)
 Finance Act 2007 section 22(3) (Appointed Day) Order 2007 (S.I. 2007/2118)
 Individual Savings Account (Amendment) Regulations 2007 (S.I. 2007/2119)
 Personal Equity Plan (Amendment) Regulations 2007 (S.I. 2007/2120)
 Social Security (Ireland) Order 2007 (S.I. 2007/2122)
 Armed Forces, Army, Air Force and Naval Discipline Acts (Continuation) Order 2007 (S.I. 2007/2123)
 Consular Fees (Amendment) (No. 2) Order 2007 (S.I. 2007/2124)
 Films Co-Production Agreements (Amendment) Order 2007 (S.I. 2007/2125)
 International Mutual Administrative Assistance in Tax Matters Order 2007 (S.I. 2007/2126)
 Double Taxation Relief (Taxes on Income) (Macedonia) Order 2007 (S.I. 2007/2127)
 Secretary of State for Justice Order 2007 (S.I. 2007/2128)
 Transfer of Functions (Olympics and Paralympics) Order 2007 (S.I. 2007/2129)
 Lebanon (United Nations Sanctions) (Overseas Territories) (Amendment) Order 2007 (S.I. 2007/2131)
 Iran (United Nations Measures) (Overseas Territories) (Amendment) Order 2007 (S.I. 2007/2132)
 European Communities (Designation) (No. 4) Order 2007 (S.I. 2007/2133)
 European Communities (Definition of Treaties) (Agreement amending the Cotonou Agreement) Order 2007 (S.I. 2007/2135)
 European Communities (Definition of Treaties) (Amended Cotonou Agreement) (Community Aid Internal Agreement) Order 2007 (S.I. 2007/2136)
 European Communities (Definition of Treaties) (Stabilisation and Association Agreement) (Republic of Albania) Order 2007 (S.I. 2007/2137)
 Liberia (Restrictive Measures) (Overseas Territories) (Amendment No. 2) Order 2007 (S.I. 2007/2138)
 Scotland Act 1998 (Cross-Border Public Authorities) (Traffic Commissioner for the Scottish Traffic Area) Order 2007 (S.I. 2007/2139)
 International Tribunals (Sierra Leone) (Application of Provisions) Order 2007 (S.I. 2007/2140)
 Virgin Islands (Territorial Sea) Order 2007 (S.I. 2007/2141)
 National Assembly for Wales (Diversion of Functions) (No. 2) Order 2007 (S.I. 2007/2142)
 National Assembly for Wales (Legislative Competence) (Amendment of Schedule 7 to the Government of Wales Act 2006) Order 2007 (S.I. 2007/2143)
 Inspectors of Education, Children's Services and Skills (No. 4) Order 2007 (S.I. 2007/2144)
 The Official Secrets Act 1989 (Prescription) (Amendment) Order 2007 (S.I. 2007/2148)
 Rehabilitation of Offenders Act 1974 (Exceptions) (Amendment) (England and Wales) Order 2007 (S.I. 2007/2149)
 Child Benefit (General) (Amendment) Regulations 2007 (S.I. 2007/2150)
 Child Tax Credit (Amendment) Regulations 2007 (S.I. 2007/2151)
 Betting and Gaming Duties Act 1981 (Bingo Monetary Amounts) Order 2007 (S.I. 2007/2152)
 Tax Avoidance Schemes (Information) (Amendment) Regulations 2007 (S.I. 2007/2153)
 Plant Health (Phytophthora ramorum) (England) (Amendment) Order 2007 (S.I. 2007/2155)
 Money Laundering Regulations 2007 (S.I. 2007/2157)
 Categories of Gaming Machine Regulations 2007 (S.I. 2007/2158)
 Gambling Act 2005 (Horserace Betting Levy) Order 2007 (S.I. 2007/2159)
 Financial Services and Markets Act 2000 (Markets in Financial Instruments) (Amendment No. 2) Regulations 2007 (S.I. 2007/2160)
 Lasting Powers of Attorney, Enduring Powers of Attorney and Public Guardian (Amendment) Regulations 2007 (S.I. 2007/2161)
 Community Order (Review by Specified Courts) Order 2007 (S.I. 2007/2162)
 Value Added Tax (Betting, Gaming and Lotteries) Order 2007 (S.I. 2007/2163)
 Registration of Marriages (Amendment) Regulations 2007 (S.I. 2007/2164)
 Capital Allowances (Energy-saving Plant and Machinery) (Amendment) Order 2007 (S.I. 2007/2165)
 Capital Allowances (Environmentally Beneficial Plant and Machinery) (Amendment) Order 2007 (S.I. 2007/2166)
 Gaming Duty (Amendment) Regulations 2007 (S.I. 2007/2167)
 Aggregates Levy (Registration and Miscellaneous Provisions) (Amendment) Regulations 2007 (S.I. 2007/2168)
 Gambling Act 2005 (Commencement No. 6 and Transitional Provisions) (Amendment) (No. 2) Order 2007 (S.I. 2007/2169)
 Export Control (Iran) (Amendment) Order 2007 (S.I. 2007/2170)
 Criminal Justice and Court Services Act 2000 (Amendment) Order 2007 (S.I. 2007/2171)
 Finance Act 2007 Schedule 1 (Appointed Date) Order 2007 (S.I. 2007/2172)
 Value Added Tax (Supply of Services) (Amendment) Order 2007 (S.I. 2007/2173)
 Non-Contentious Probate Fees (Amendment) Order 2007 (S.I. 2007/2174)
 Family Proceedings Fees (Amendment) (No. 2) Order 2007 (S.I. 2007/2175)
 Civil Proceedings Fees (Amendment) (No. 2) Order 2007 (S.I. 2007/2176)
 North East Lincolnshire Primary Care Trust (Change of Name) (Establishment) Amendment Order 2007 (S.I. 2007/2177)
 Medicines for Human Use (Administration and Sale or Supply) (Miscellaneous Amendments) Order 2007 (S.I. 2007/2178)
 Medicines (Sale or Supply) (Miscellaneous Provisions) Amendment Regulations 2007 (S.I. 2007/2179)
 Violent Crime Reduction Act 2006 (Commencement No. 3) Order 2007 (S.I. 2007/2180)
 Terrorism Act 2006 (Disapplication of Section 25) Order 2007 (S.I. 2007/2181)
 Children Act 2004 Information Database (England) Regulations 2007 (S.I. 2007/2182)
 Regulatory Reform (Deer) (England and Wales) Order 2007 (S.I. 2007/2183)
 Terrorism Act 2000 (Proscribed Organisations) (Amendment) Order 2007 (S.I. 2007/2184)
 Judicial Pensions and Retirement Act 1993 (Addition of Qualifying Judicial Offices) (No. 2) Order 2007 (S.I. 2007/2185)
 Verification of Information in Passport Applications Etc.(Specified Persons) Order 2007 (S.I. 2007/2186)
 Family Proceedings (Amendment) (No. 2) Rules 2007 (S.I. 2007/2187)
 Family Proceedings Courts (Miscellaneous Amendments) Rules 2007 (S.I. 2007/2188)
 Family Procedure (Adoption) (Amendment) Rules 2007 (S.I. 2007/2189)
 Marketing of Vegetable Plant Material (Wales) (Amendment) Regulations 2007 (S.I. 2007/2190)
 Hydrocarbon Oil Duties (Reliefs for Electricity Generation) (Amendment) Regulations 2007 (S.I. 2007/2191)
 Remote Gaming Duty Regulations 2007 (S.I. 2007/2192)
 Enterprise Act 2002 (Disclosure of Information for Civil Proceedings etc.) Order 2007 (S.I. 2007/2193)
 Companies Act 2006 (Commencement No. 3, Consequential Amendments, Transitional Provisions and Savings) Order 2007 (S.I. 2007/2194)
 Postal Packets (Revenue and Customs) Regulations 2007 (S.I. 2007/2195)
 Regulation of Investigatory Powers Act 2000 (Commencement No. 4) Order 2007 (S.I. 2007/2196)
 Regulation of Investigatory Powers (Acquisition and Disclosure of Communications Data: Code of Practice) Order 2007 (S.I. 2007/2197)
 Offshore Installations (Safety Zones) (No. 5) Order 2007 (S.I. 2007/2198)
 Data Retention (EC Directive) Regulations 2007 (S.I. 2007/2199)
 Regulation of Investigatory Powers (Investigation of Protected Electronic Information: Code of Practice) Order 2007 (S.I. 2007/2200)

2201-2300

 Private Security Industry Act 2001 (Amendments to Schedule 2) Order 2007 (S.I. 2007/2201)
 Housing Benefit (Loss of Benefit) (Pilot Scheme) Regulations 2007 (S.I. 2007/2202)
 Diseases of Animals (Approved Disinfectants) (Fees) (England) Order 2007 (S.I. 2007/2203)
 Civil Procedure (Amendment) Rules 2007 (S.I. 2007/2204)
 Railway Pensions (Transfer of Pension Schemes) Order 2007 (S.I. 2007/2205)
 Asylum (Designated States) Order 2007 (S.I. 2007/2211)
 Persons Providing Education at Further Education Institutions in Wales (Conditions) Regulations 2007 (S.I. 2007/2220)
 Magistrates' Courts (Parenting Orders) (Amendment) Rules 2007 (S.I. 2007/2222)
 Extradition Act 2003 (Amendment to Designations) Order 2007 (S.I. 2007/2238)
 Charges for Music Tuition (England) Regulations 2007 (S.I. 2007/2239)
 Gambling Act 2005 (Exempt Gaming in Alcohol-Licensed Premises) (Amendment) Regulations 2007 (S.I. 2007/2240)
 Education (National Curriculum) (Science at Key Stage 4) (England) Order 2007 (S.I. 2007/2241)
 Companies (Interest Rate for Unauthorised Political Donation or Expenditure) Regulations 2007 (S.I. 2007/2242)
 Transmissible Spongiform Encephalopathies (Wales) (Amendment) (No. 2) Regulations 2007 (S.I. 2007/2244)
 Eggs and Chicks (England) Regulations 2007 (S.I. 2007/2245)
 Pollution Prevention and Control (Designation of Directives) (England and Wales) Order 2007 (S.I. 2007/2247)
 A650 Trunk Road (Aireville Road to Hard Ings Roundabout) (Detrunking) Order 2007 (S.I. 2007/2248)
 A629 Trunk Road (City Boundary to Hard Ings Roundabout) (Detrunking) Order 2007 (S.I. 2007/2249)
 A629 Trunk Road (Snaygill Roundabout to County Boundary) (Detrunking) Order 2007 (S.I. 2007/2251)
 A629 Trunk Road (Thorlby Roundabout to Snaygill Roundabout) (Detrunking) Order 2007 (S.I. 2007/2253)
 Gambling Act 2005 (Operating Licence Conditions) Regulations 2007 (S.I. 2007/2257)
 Gambling Act 2005 (Premises Licences) (Review) Regulations 2007 (S.I. 2007/2258)
 Terrorism (Northern Ireland) Act 2006 (Transitional Provisions and Savings) Order 2007 (S.I. 2007/2259)
 Education (Supply of Information about the School Workforce) (No. 2) (England) Regulations 2007 (S.I. 2007/2260)
 Education (School Attendance Targets) (England) Regulations 2007 (S.I. 2007/2261)
 Scottish Parliament (Elections etc.) (Amendment) Order 2007 (S.I. 2007/2262)
 Education (Student Fees, Awards and Support) (Amendment) (No. 2) Regulations 2007 (S.I. 2007/2263)
 Further Education Teachers' Qualifications (England) Regulations 2007 (S.I. 2007/2264)
 Education (National Curriculum) (Attainment Targets and Programmes of Study) (England) (Amendment) Order 2007 (S.I. 2007/2265)
 Food (Suspension of the Use of E 128 Red 2G as Food Colour) (England) Regulations 2007 (S.I. 2007/2266)
 Magistrates' Courts (Reciprocal Enforcement of Maintenance Orders) (Miscellaneous Amendment) Rules 2007 (S.I. 2007/2267)
 Family Proceedings (Amendment) (No. 3) Rules 2007 (S.I. 2007/2268)
 Employment Equality (Sexual Orientation) (Religion or Belief) (Amendment) Regulations 2007 (S.I. 2007/2269)
 A629 Trunk Road (Skipton to Kildwick Improvement and Slip Roads) Order 1996 (Revocation) Order 2007 (S.I. 2007/2270)
 A629 Trunk Road (Ings Lane to Cononley Lane) (Detrunking) Order 1996 (Revocation) Order 2007 (S.I. 2007/2273)
 Education (School Teachers' Pay and Conditions) Order 2007 (S.I. 2007/2282)
 Local Justice Areas Order 2007 (S.I. 2007/2284)
 Town and Country Planning (Amendment of Appeals Procedures) (Wales) Rules 2007 (S.I. 2007/2285)
 Income Tax (Pay As You Earn) (Amendment No. 3) Regulations 2007 (S.I. 2007/2286)
 Children and Adoption Act 2006 (Commencement No. 1) Order 2007 (S.I. 2007/2287)
 Food (Suspension of the use of E 128 Red 2G as Food Colour) (Wales) Regulations 2007 (S.I. 2007/2288)
 Gaming Machine (Single Apparatus) Regulations 2007 (S.I. 2007/2289)
 Income Tax (Pay As You Earn) (Amendment No. 3) Regulations 2007 (S.I. 2007/2296)
 Docklands Light Railway (Capacity Enhancement and 2012 Games Preparation) Order 2007 (S.I. 2007/2297)
 A449 Trunk Road (Dudley, Staffordshire and Worcestershire) (Detrunking) Order 2007 (S.I. 2007/2298)

2301-2400

 National Lottery (Amendment) Regulations 2007 (S.I. 2007/2307)
 Education (Fees and Awards) (Wales) Regulations 2007 (S.I. 2007/2310)
 Education Maintenance Allowances (Wales) Regulations 2007 (S.I. 2007/2311)
 Assembly Learning Grants and Loans (Higher Education) (Wales) (Amendment) Regulations 2007 (S.I. 2007/2312)
 Assembly Learning Grants (European Institutions) (Wales) Regulations 2007 (S.I. 2007/2313)
 Assembly Learning Grant (Further Education) Regulations 2007 (S.I. 2007/2314)
 Food (Suspension of the use of E 128 Red 2G as Food Colour) (Wales) (No. 2) Regulations 2007 (S.I. 2007/2315)
 Children and Young People's Plan (Wales) Regulations 2007 (S.I. 2007/2316)
 Criminal Procedure (Amendment No. 2) Rules 2007 (S.I. 2007/2317)
 National Minimum Wage Regulations 1999 (Amendment) Regulations 2007 (S.I. 2007/2318)
 Gaming Machine (Circumstances of Use) Regulations 2007 (S.I. 2007/2319)
 Gaming Machine (Supply &c.) Regulations 2007 (S.I. 2007/2320)
 Gambling Act 2005 (Repeal) (Remote Operating Licence and Credit) Regulations 2007 (S.I. 2007/2321)
 Road Traffic (Permitted Parking Area and Special Parking Area) (County of West Sussex) (Borough of Worthing) Order 2007 (S.I. 2007/2322)
 Bus Lane Contraventions (Approved Local Authorities) (England) (Amendment) (No. 5) Order 2007 (S.I. 2007/2323)
 Education (School Performance Information) (England) Regulations 2007 (S.I. 2007/2324)
 Large Combustion Plants (National Emission Reduction Plan) Regulations 2007 (S.I. 2007/2325)
 Wireless Telegraphy (Licence Charges) (Amendment) Regulations 2007 (S.I. 2007/2326)
 Small Society Lotteries (Registration of Non-Commercial Societies) Regulations 2007 (S.I. 2007/2328)
 Gambling Act 2005 (Advertising of Foreign Gambling) Regulations 2007 (S.I. 2007/2329)
 Import and Export Restrictions (Foot-And-Mouth Disease) (Wales) Regulations 2007 (S.I. 2007/2330)
 Import and Export Restrictions (Foot-And-Mouth Disease) Regulations 2007 (S.I. 2007/2331)
 Private and Voluntary Health Care (Wales) (Amendment) Regulations 2007 (S.I. 2007/2332)
 Common Agricultural Policy (Wine) (Wales) (Amendment) Regulations 2007 (S.I. 2007/2333)
 Dedicated Highways (Registers under Section 31A of the Highways Act 1980) (England) Regulations 2007 (S.I. 2007/2334)
 Countryside and Rights of Way Act 2000 (Commencement No. 13) Order 2007 (S.I. 2007/2335)
 Legal Officers (Annual Fees) Order 2007 (S.I. 2007/2336)
 Birmingham City Council (Selly Oak New Road Tunnel) Scheme 2007 Confirmation Instrument 2007 (S.I. 2007/2339)
 Ecclesiastical Judges, Legal Officers and Others (Fees) Order 2007 (S.I. 2007/2340)
 Value Added Tax Tribunals (Amendment) Rules 2007 (S.I. 2007/2351)
 Education (Nutritional Standards and Requirements for School Food) (England) Regulations 2007 (S.I. 2007/2359)
 Drivers' Hours (Goods Vehicles) (Milk Collection) (Temporary Exemption) Regulations 2007 (S.I. 2007/2370)
 Planning and Compulsory Purchase Act 2004 (Commencement No. 4 and Consequential, Transitional and Savings Provisions) (Wales) (Amendment No.3) Order 2007 (S.I. 2007/2371)
 Home Loss Payments (Prescribed Amounts) (Wales) Regulations 2007 (S.I. 2007/2372)
 Arnos Vale Cemetery, Bristol (Burial Records) Order 2007 (S.I. 2007/2373)
 Air Navigation (Restriction of Flying) (South Armagh) (Revocation) Regulations 2007 (S.I. 2007/2374)
 Import and Export Restrictions (Foot-And-Mouth Disease) (No. 2) Regulations 2007 (S.I. 2007/2375)
 Air Navigation (Restriction of Flying) (Security Establishments in Northern Ireland) (Revocation) Regulations 2007 (S.I. 2007/2376)
 Air Navigation (Restriction of Flying) (Prisons) (Amendment) Regulations 2007 (S.I. 2007/2377)
 Import and Export Restrictions (Foot-And-Mouth Disease) (No. 2) (Wales) Regulations 2007 (S.I. 2007/2385)
 Commons Act 2006 (Commencement No.1, Transitional Provisions and Savings) (Wales) Order 2007 (S.I. 2007/2386)
 Commons (Registration of Town or Village Greens) (Interim Arrangements) (Wales) Regulations 2007 (S.I. 20072396)
 Courts-Martial (Army) (Amendment) Rules 2007 (S.I. 2007/2397)
 Agricultural Holdings (Units of Production) (Wales) Order 2007 (S.I. 2007/2398)

2401-2500

 Social Security (Contributions) (Amendment No. 7) Regulations 2007 (S.I. 2007/2401)
 Financial Services and Markets Act 2000 (Motor Insurance) Regulations 2007 (S.I. 2007/2403)
 Commons Registration (General) (Amendment) (England) (No. 2) Regulations 2007 (S.I. 2007/2404)
 Disability Discrimination Act 1995 (Amendment etc.) (General Qualifications Bodies) (Alteration of Premises and Enforcement) Regulations 2007 (S.I. 2007/2405)
 Hydrocarbon Oil Duties (Sulphur-free Diesel) (Hydrogenation of Biomass) (Reliefs) (Amendment) Regulations 2007 (S.I. 2007/2406)
 Animal Gatherings (Wales) Order 2007 (S.I. 2007/2425)
 Non-Domestic Rating (Small Business Relief) (Wales) (Amendment) Order 2007 (S.I. 2007/2438)
 Charges for Residues Surveillance (Amendment) Regulations 2007 (S.I. 2007/2439)
 Wireless Telegraphy (Ultra-Wideband Equipment) (Exemption) (Amendment) Regulations 2007 (S.I. 2007/2440)
 Community Legal Service (Funding) Order 2007 (S.I. 2007/2441)
 Community Legal Service (Financial) (Amendment No. 2) Regulations 2007 (S.I. 2007/2442)
 Community Legal Service (Funding) (Counsel in Family Proceedings) (Amendment) Order 2007 (S.I. 2007/2443)
 Community Legal Service (Costs) (Amendment) Regulations 2007 (S.I. 2007/2444)
 Social Security Act 1989 (Commencement No. 6) Order 2007 (S.I. 2007/2445)
 Offshore Installations (Safety Zones) (No. 6) Order 2007 (S.I. 2007/2446)
 Planning and Compulsory Purchase Act 2004 (Commencement No.4 and Consequential, Transitional and Savings Provisions) (Wales) (Amendment No.4) Order 2007 (S.I. 2007/2447)
 Planning and Compulsory Purchase Act 2004 (Commencement No. 4 and Consequential, Transitional and Savings Provisions) (Wales) (Amendment No. 5) Order 2007 (S.I. 2007/2449)
 Water Industry (Prescribed Conditions) (Amendment) Regulations 2007 (S.I. 2007/2457)
 Environmental Noise (Identification of Noise Sources) (England) (Amendment) Regulations 2007 (S.I. 2007/2458)
 Zoonoses (Monitoring) (Wales) Regulations 2007 (S.I. 2007/2459)
 Smoke Control Areas (Authorised Fuels) (England) (Amendment) Regulations 2007 (S.I. 2007/2460)
 Welfare of Animals (Slaughter or Killing) (Amendment) (Wales) Regulations 2007 (S.I. 2007/2461)
 Smoke Control Areas (Exempted Fireplaces) (England) Order 2007 (S.I. 2007/2462)
 Dangerous Wild Animals Act 1976 (Modification) (No. 2) Order 2007 (S.I. 2007/2465)
 Plant Protection Products (Amendment) (No. 3) Regulations 2007 (S.I. 2007/2466)
 Social Security (Miscellaneous Amendments) (No. 4) Regulations 2007 (S.I. 2007/2470)
 Tobacco Products (Manufacture, Presentation and Sale) (Safety) (Amendment) Regulations 2007 (S.I. 2007/2473)
 Housing Benefit (Loss of Benefit) (Pilot Scheme) (Supplementary) Regulations 2007 (S.I. 2007/2474)
 Disease Control (Wales) (Amendment) Order 2007 (S.I. 2007/2475)
 Foot-and-Mouth Disease (Export Restrictions) (Wales) Regulations 2007 (S.I. 2007/2477)
 Income Tax (Qualifying Child Care) (No. 2) Regulations 2007 (S.I. 2007/2478)
 Working Tax Credit (Entitlement and Maximum Rate) (Amendment No. 2) Regulations 2007 (S.I. 2007/2479)
 Tax Credit (New Category of Child Care Provider) (Revocation) (England) Regulations 2007 (S.I. 2007/2480)
 Tax Credits (Child Care Providers) (Miscellaneous Revocation and Transitional Provisions) (England) Scheme 2007 (S.I. 2007/2481)
 Tonnage Tax (Training Requirement) (Amendment) Regulations 2007 (S.I. 2007/2482)
 Finance Act 2007 (Schedules 13 and 14) Order 2007 (S.I. 2007/2483)
 Sale and Repurchase of Securities (Amendment of Instruments) Order 2007 (S.I. 2007/2484)
 Sale and Repurchase of Securities (Modification of Schedule 13 to the Finance Act 2007) Regulations 2007 (S.I. 2007/2485)
 Sale and Repurchase of Securities (Modification of Enactments) Regulations 2007 (S.I. 2007/2486)
 Income Tax (Manufactured Overseas Dividends) (Amendment) Regulations 2007 (S.I. 2007/2487)
 Manufactured Interest (Tax) Regulations 2007 (S.I. 2007/2488)
 Foot-and-Mouth Disease (Export Restrictions) Regulations 2007 (S.I. 2007/2489)
 Racial and Religious Hatred Act 2006 (Commencement No. 1) Order 2007 (S.I. 2007/2490)
 Northern Ireland (St Andrews Agreement) Act 2006 (Commencement No. 2) Order 2007 (S.I. 2007/2491)
 Hallmarking Act 1973 (Exemption) (Amendment No. 2) Order 2007 (S.I. 2007/2493)
 Diseases of Animals (Approved Disinfectants) (Amendment) (Wales) Order 2007 (S.I. 2007/2494)
 Gambling (Lottery Machine Interval) Order 2007 (S.I. 2007/2495)
 Zoonoses and Animal By-Products (Fees) (Wales) Regulations 2007 (S.I. 2007/2496)
 Electronic Commerce Directive (Racial and Religious Hatred Act 2006) Regulations 2007 (S.I. 2007/2497)
 Common Agricultural Policy Single Payment and Support Schemes (Cross-compliance) (England) (Amendment) Regulations 2007 (S.I. 2007/2500)

2501-2600

 Political Parties, Elections and Referendums Act 2000 (Northern Ireland Political Parties) Order 2007 (S.I. 2007/2501)
 Licensing Act 2003 (Summary Review of Premises Licences) Regulations 2007 (S.I. 2007/2502)
 Private Security Industry Act 2001 Regulations (Amendment) Regulations 2007 (S.I. 2007/2504)
 Violent Crime Reduction Act 2006 (Commencement No. 4) Order 2007 (S.I. 2007/2518)
 Social Security (Contributions) (Amendment No. 8) Regulations 2007 (S.I. 2007/2520)
 Disabled Persons (Badges for Motor Vehicles) (England) (Amendment) Regulations 2007 (S.I. 2007/2531)
 Finance Act 2007, Schedule 25 (Commencement and Transitional Provisions) Order 2007 (S.I. 2007/2532)
 Financial Assistance Scheme (Halting Annuitisation) Regulations 2007 (S.I. 2007/2533)
 Road Traffic (Permitted Parking Area and Special Parking Area) (County of Staffordshire) (Staffordshire Moorlands and East Staffordshire) Order 2007 (S.I. 2007/2534)
 Road Traffic (Permitted Parking Area and Special Parking Area) (Metropolitan Borough of Solihull) Order 2007 (S.I. 2007/2535)
 Bus Lane Contraventions (Approved Local Authorities) (England) (Amendment) (No. 6) Order 2007 (S.I. 2007/2536)
 Insolvency (Scotland) Amendment Rules 2007 (S.I. 2007/2537)
 Independent Living Fund (2006) Order 2007 (S.I. 2007/2538)
 Veterinary Medicines Regulations 2007 (S.I. 2007/2539)
 Natural Environment and Rural Communities Act 2006 (Commencement No. 1) (England) Order 2007 (S.I. 2007/2540)
 Companies (Tables A to F) (Amendment) Regulations 2007 (S.I. 2007/2541)
 National Park Authorities' Traffic Orders (Procedure) (England) Regulations 2007 (S.I. 2007/2542)
 Local Government (Best Value Authorities) (Power to Trade) (England) (Amendment No. 2) Order 2007 (S.I. 2007/2543)
 Road Vehicles (Construction and Use) (Amendment) (No. 2) Regulations 2007 (S.I. 2007/2544)
 Road Vehicles (Registration and Licensing) (Amendment) (No. 3) Regulations 2007 (S.I. 2007/2553)
 Sea Fishing (Prohibition on the Removal of Shark Fins) Order 2007 (S.I. 2007/2554)
 Social Security (National Insurance Credits) Amendment Regulations 2007 (S.I. 2007/2582)
 Supervision of Accounts and Reports (Prescribed Body) Order 2007 (S.I. 2007/2583)
 Commons Act 2006 (Commencement No. 3, Transitional Provisions and Savings) (England) Order 2007 (S.I. 2007/2484)
 Commons (Deregistration and Exchange Orders) (Interim Arrangements) (England) Regulations 2007 (S.I. 2007/2585)
 Porcine Semen (Fees) (England) Regulations 2007 (S.I. 2007/2586)
 Works on Common Land (Exemptions) (England) Order 2007 (S.I. 2007/2587)
 Works on Common Land, etc. (Procedure) (England) Regulations 2007 (S.I. 2007/2588)
 Deregistration and Exchange of Common Land and Greens (Procedure) (England) Regulations 2007 (S.I. 2007/2589)
 National Health Service (Travel Expenses and Remission of Charges) (Amendment No.2) Regulations 2007 (S.I. 2007/2590)
 Food for Particular Nutritional Uses (Miscellaneous Amendments) (England) Regulations 2007 (S.I. 2007/2591)
 Local Authorities (Functions and Responsibilities) (England) (Amendment No. 4) Regulations 2007 (S.I. 2007/2593)
 Countryside and Rights of Way Act 2000 (Commencement No. 14) Order 2007 (S.I. 2007/2595)
 Pet Cemeteries (England and Wales) Regulations 2007 (S.I. 2007/2596)
 Commons Registration (General) (Amendment) (Wales) Regulations 2007 (S.I. 2007/2597)
 Manufacture and Storage of Explosives and the Health and Safety (Enforcing Authority) (Amendment and Supplementary Provisions) Regulations 2007 (S.I. 2007/2598)
 New Woodlands School Order 2007 (S.I. 2007/2599)
 Disabled Persons (Badges for Motor Vehicles) (England) (Amendment No. 2) Regulations 2007 (S.I. 2007/2600)

2601-2700

 Houses in Multiple Occupation (Specified Educational Establishments) (England) (No. 2) Regulations 2007 (S.I. 2007/2601)
 Equality Act 2006 (Dissolution of Commissions and Consequential and Transitional Provisions) Order 2007 (S.I. 2007/2602)
 Equality Act 2006 (Commencement No. 3 and Savings) Order 2007 (S.I. 2007/2603)
 Equality Act 2006 (Termination of Appointments) Order 2007 (S.I. 2007/2604)
 Firearms (Amendment) Rules 2007 (S.I. 2007/2605)
 Violent Crime Reduction Act 2006 (Realistic Imitation Firearms) Regulations 2007 (S.I. 2007/2606)
 Companies Act 2006 (Commencement No. 4 and Commencement No. 3 (Amendment)) Order 2007 (S.I. 2007/2607)
 Armed Forces (Gurkha Pensions) Order 2007 (S.I. 2007/2608)
 Armed Forces (Gurkha Compensation) Order 2007 (S.I. 2007/2609)
 Environmental Impact Assessment and Natural Habitats (Extraction of Minerals by Marine Dredging) (Wales) Regulations 2007 (S.I. 2007/2610)
 Nutrition and Health Claims (Wales) Regulations 2007 (S.I. 2007/2611)
 Companies (Fees for Inspection and Copying of Company Records) Regulations 2007 (S.I. 2007/2612)
 Social Security Benefit (Computation of Earnings) (Amendment) Regulations 2007 (S.I. 2007/2613)
 Social Security Benefit (Computation of Earnings) (Amendment) Regulations (Northern Ireland) 2007 (S.I. 2007/2614)
 Financial Services and Markets Act 2000 (Financial Promotion) (Amendment No. 2) Order 2007 (S.I. 2007/2615)
 Public Guardian (Fees, etc.) (Amendment) Regulations 2007 (S.I. 2007/2616)
 Court Funds (Amendment No. 2) Rules 2007 (S.I. 2007/2617)
 Social Security (Miscellaneous Amendments) (No. 5) Regulations 2007 (S.I. 2007/2618)
 Magistrates' Courts Fees (Amendment) Order 2007 (S.I. 2007/2619)
 Protection of Children and Vulnerable Adults and Care Standards Tribunal (Review of Inclusion in the PoCA List and Review of Section 142 Directions) Regulations 2007 (S.I. 2007/2620)
 Family Proceedings Courts (Constitution of Committees and Right to Preside) (Amendment) Rules 2007 (S.I. 2007/2621)
 Youth Courts (Constitution of Committees and Right to Preside) (Amendment) Rules 2007 (S.I. 2007/2622)
 Disease Control (England) (Amendment) (No. 2) Order 2007 (S.I. 2007/2623)
 Bluetongue (Amendment) Order 2007 (S.I. 2007/2624)
 Disease Control (Wales) (Amendment) (No. 2) Order 2007 (S.I. 2007/2626)
 Mental Health Act 2007 (Commencement No. 2) Order 2007 (S.I. 2007/2635)
 Charities (Exception from Registration) (Amendment) Regulations 2007 (S.I. 2007/2655)
 Motor Cycles Etc. (EC Type Approval) (Amendment) Regulations 2007 (S.I. 2007/2656)
 London Gateway Logistics and Commercial Centre Order 2007 (S.I. 2007/2657)
 Road Traffic (Permitted Parking Area and Special Parking Area) (County of Worcestershire) (District of Wyre Forest) Order 2007 (S.I. 2007/2684)
 Education (Listed Bodies) (England) Order 2007 (S.I. 2007/2687)
 Education (Recognised Bodies) (England) Order 2007 (S.I. 2007/2688)
 Gambling Act 2005 (Club Gaming and Club Machine Permits) (Amendment) Regulations 2007 (S.I. 2007/2689)

2701-2800

 Harborough (Parishes) Order 2007 (S.I. 2007/2705)
 Courts Act 2003 (Commencement No. 13) Order 2007 (S.I. 2007/2706)
 Spring Traps Approval (Variation) (England) Order 2007 (S.I. 2007/2708)
 Tribunals, Courts and Enforcement Act 2007 (Commencement No. 1) Order 2007 (S.I. 2007/2709)
 Import and Export Restrictions (Foot-and-Mouth Disease) (No. 3) (Wales) Regulations 2007 (S.I. 2007/2710)
 Animal Welfare Act 2006 (Commencement No. 2 and Saving and Transitional Provisions) (England) Order 2007 (S.I. 2007/2711)
 Import and Export Restrictions (Foot-and-Mouth Disease) (No. 3) Regulations 2007 (S.I. 2007/2712)
 Plant Health (Phytophthora ramorum) (Wales) (Amendment) Order 2007 (S.I. 2007/2715)
 Plant Health (Wales) (Amendment) Order 2007 (S.I. 2007/2716)
 Childcare Act 2006 (Commencement No. 3 and Transitional Provision) Order 2007 (S.I. 2007/2717)
 Water Supply (Water Quality) Regulations 2000 (Amendment) Regulations 2007 (S.I. 2007/2734)
 Haringey Sixth Form Centre (Governing Body) Order 2007 (S.I. 2007/2741)
 County Durham and Darlington National Health Service Foundation Trust (Transfer of Trust Property) Order 2007 (S.I. 2007/2742)
 Lincolnshire Partnership National Health Service Trust (Transfer of Trust Property) Order 2007 (S.I. 2007/2743)
 Portsmouth City Teaching Primary Care Trust (Transfer of Trust Property) Order 2007 (S.I. 2007/2744)
 Surrey and Sussex Healthcare National Health Service Trust (Transfer of Trust Property) Order 2007 (S.I. 2007/2745)
 South Downs Health National Health Service Trust (Transfer of Trust Property) Order 2007 (S.I. 2007/2746)
 Seed (Miscellaneous Amendments) (Wales) Regulations 2007 (S.I. 2007/2747)
 Police Federation (Amendment) Regulations 2007 (S.I. 2007/2751)
 Food for Particular Nutritional Uses (Miscellaneous Amendments) (Wales) Regulations 2007 (S.I. 2007/2753)
 Police and Justice Act 2006 (Commencement No. 4) Order 2007 (S.I. 2007/2754)
 Imperial College Healthcare National Health Service Trust (Establishment) and the Hammersmith Hospitals National Health Service Trust and the St Mary's National Health Service Trust (Dissolution) Order 2007 (S.I. 2007/2755)
 Staffordshire Ambulance Service National Health Service Trust (Dissolution) Order 2007 (S.I. 2007/2756)
 European Communities (Recognition of Professional Qualifications) Regulations 2007 (S.I. 2007/2781)
 Education (Recognition of School Teachers' Professional Qualifications) (Consequential Provisions) (England) Regulations 2007 (S.I. 2007/2782)
 Fire and Rescue Services (England) (Amendment) Order 2007 (S.I. 2007/2784)
 Natural Mineral Water, Spring Water and Bottled Drinking Water (England) Regulations 2007 (S.I. 2007/2785)
 Plastic Materials and Articles in Contact with Food (Lid Gaskets) (England) Regulations 2007 (S.I. 2007/2786)
 Materials and Articles in Contact with Food (England) Regulations 2007 (S.I. 2007/2790)
 Education (Listed Bodies) (Wales) Order 2007 (S.I. 2007/2794)
 Education (Recognised Bodies) (Wales) Order 2007 (S.I. 2007/2795)
 Medical Act 1983 Amendments (Further Transitional Provisions) Order of Council 2007 (S.I. 2007/2796)
 Road Traffic (Permitted Parking Area and Special Parking Area) (County of Staffordshire) (Newcastle-under-Lyme and Stafford) Order 2007 (S.I. 2007/2797)
 Mental Health Act 2007 (Commencement No. 3) Order 2007 (S.I. 2007/2798)
 Concessionary Bus Travel Act 2007 (Commencement and Transitional Provisions) Order 2007 (S.I. 2007/2799)
 Family Proceedings Fees (Amendment) (No. 2) (Amendment) Order 2007 (S.I. 2007/2800)

2801-2900

 Civil Proceedings Fees (Amendment) (No. 2) (Amendment) Order 2007 (S.I. 2007/2801)
 Designation of Schools Having a Religious Character (Independent Schools) (England) (No. 2) Order 2007 (S.I. 2007/2802)
 Diseases of Animals (Approved Disinfectants) (Wales) Order 2007 (S.I. 2007/2803)
 Bluetongue (Amendment) (No. 2) Order 2007 (S.I. 2007/2808)
 Movement of Animals (Restrictions) (England) (Amendment) Order 2007 (S.I. 2007/2809)
 General Teaching Council for Wales (Additional Functions) (Amendment) Order 2007 (S.I. 2007/2810)
 Education (Amendments to Regulations regarding the Recognition of Professional Qualifications) (Wales) Regulations 2007 (S.I. 2007/2811)
 Welfare Reform Act 2007 Commencement (No. 3) Order 2007 (S.I. 2007/2819)
 Companies (Tables A to F) (Amendment) (No. 2) Regulations 2007 (S.I. 2007/2826)
 Road Traffic (Permitted Parking Area and Special Parking Area) (County of Gloucestershire) (Cheltenham, Cotswold, Gloucester, Stroud and Tewkesbury) Order 2007 (S.I. 2007/2837)
 Bus Lane Contraventions (Approved Local Authorities) (England) (Amendment) (No. 7) Order 2007 (S.I. 2007/2838)
 Parochial Fees Order 2007 (S.I. 2007/2850)
 Assembly Learning Grants and Loans (Higher Education) (Wales) (Amendment) (No.2) Regulations 2007 (S.I. 2007/2851)
 Housing Benefit (Local Housing Allowance and Information Sharing) Amendment Regulations 2007 (S.I. 2007/2868)
 Housing Benefit (State Pension Credit) (Local Housing Allowance and Information Sharing) Amendment Regulations 2007 (S.I. 2007/2869)
 Housing Benefit (Local Housing Allowance, Miscellaneous and Consequential) Amendment Regulations 2007 (S.I. 2007/2870)
 Rent Officers (Housing Benefit Functions) Amendment Order 2007 (S.I. 2007/2871)
 Welfare Reform Act 2007 (Commencement No. 4, and Savings and Transitional Provisions) Order 2007 (S.I. 2007/2872)
 Criminal Justice Act 2003 (Commencement No. 17) Order 2007 (S.I. 2007/2874)
 Social Security (Attendance Allowance and Disability Living Allowance) (Amendment) Regulations 2007 (S.I. 2007/2875)
 Administrative Justice and Tribunals Council (Listed Tribunals) (Wales) Order 2007 (S.I. 2007/2876)
 Castle Hill Primary School (Change to School Session Times) Order 2007 (S.I. 2007/2877)
 Returning Officers (Parliamentary Constituencies) (England) Order 2007 (S.I. 2007/2878)
 Rural Development Programmes and Agricultural Subsidies and Grants Schemes (Appeals) (Wales) (Amendment) Regulations 2007 (S.I. 2007/2900)

2901-3000

 Finance Act 2006 (Climate Change Levy: Amendments and Transitional Savings in Consequence of Abolition of Half-rate Supplies) (Appointed Day) Order 2007 (S.I. 2007/2901)
 Finance Act 2007 (Climate Change Levy: Reduced-rate Supplies etc.) (Appointed Day) Order 2007 (S.I. 2007/2902)
 Climate Change Levy (General) (Amendment) Regulations 2007 (S.I. 2007/2903)
 Community Drivers' Hours and Working Time (Foot-and-Mouth Disease) (Temporary Exception) Regulations 2007 (S.I. 2007/2904)
 Social Security (Contributions) (Amendment No. 9) Regulations 2007 (S.I. 2007/2905)
 Channel Tunnel (International Arrangements) (Amendment) Order 2007 (S.I. 2007/2907)
 Channel Tunnel (Miscellaneous Provisions) (Amendment) Order 2007 (S.I. 2007/2908)
 Landfill Tax (Material Removed from Water) Order 2007 (S.I. 2007/2909)
 Gaming Duty (Additional Games) Order 2007 (S.I. 2007/2910)
 Social Security (Claims and Information) Regulations 2007 (S.I. 2007/2911)
 Social Fund Cold Weather Payments (General) Amendment Regulations 2007 (S.I. 2007/2912)
 Armed Forces Act 2006 (Commencement No. 2) Order 2007 (S.I. 2007/2913)
 Transfer of Functions (Equality) Order 2007 (S.I. 2007/2914)
 Scotland Act 1998 (Transfer of Functions to the Scottish Ministers etc.) Order 2007 (S.I. 2007/2915)
 Anguilla (Territorial Sea) Order 2007 (S.I. 2007/2916)
 Turks and Caicos Islands (Territorial Sea) (Amendment) Order 2007 (S.I. 2007/2917)
 Inspectors of Education, Children's Services and Skills (No. 5) Order 2007 (S.I. 2007/2918)
 Exempt Charities (No. 3) Order 2007 (S.I. 2007/2919)
 Channel Tunnel Rail Link (Nomination) (Amendment) Order 2007 (S.I. 2007/2920)
 Toot Hill School (School Day and School Year Regulations) Order 2007 (S.I. 2007/2921)
 Value Added Tax (Amendment) (No. 6) Regulations 2007 (S.I. 2007/2922)
 Value Added Tax (Special Provisions) (Amendment) Order 2007 (S.I. 2007/2923)
 Markets in Financial Instruments Directive (Consequential Amendments) Regulations 2007 (S.I. 2007/2932)
 Environmental Impact Assessment (Agriculture) (Wales) Regulations 2007 (S.I. 2007/2933)
 Consumers, Estate Agents and Redress Act 2007 (Commencement No. 1) Order 2007 (S.I. 2007/2934)
 Transport for London (Consequential Provisions) Order 2007 (S.I. 2007/2935)
 Criminal Defence Service (General) (No. 2) (Amendment No. 2) Regulations 2007 (S.I. 2007/2936)
 Criminal Defence Service (Financial Eligibility) (Amendment No. 2) Regulations 2007 (S.I. 2007/2937)
 Contaminants in Food (England) (Amendment) Regulations 2007 (S.I. 2007/2938)
 Plant Health (England) (Amendment) (No. 2) Order 2007 (S.I. 2007/2950)
 Administrative Justice and Tribunals Council (Listed Tribunals) Order 2007 (S.I. 2007/2951)
 Control of Trade in Endangered Species (Enforcement) (Amendment) Regulations 2007 (S.I. 2007/2952)
 Young Offender Institution (Amendment) Rules 2007 (S.I. 2007/2953)
 Prison (Amendment) Rules 2007 (S.I. 2007/2954)
 Stroud (Parishes) Order 2007 (S.I. 2007/2955)
 Agricultural Holdings (Units of Production) (England) Order 2007 (S.I. 2007/2968)
 Income Tax (Pay As You Earn) (Amendment No. 4) Regulations 2007 (S.I. 2007/2969)
 Import and Export Restrictions (Foot-and-Mouth Disease) (No. 4) Regulations 2007 (S.I. 2007/2970)
 Import and Export Restrictions (Foot-and-Mouth Disease) (No. 4) (Wales) Regulations 2007 (S.I. 2007/2971)
 Education (Local Education Authority Performance Targets) (England) (Amendment) Regulations 2007 (S.I. 2007/2972)
 Government of Wales Act 2006 (Approved European Body of Accountants) Order 2007 (S.I. 2007/2973)
 Companies (Cross-Border Mergers) Regulations 2007 (S.I. 2007/2974)
 Education (School Performance Targets) (England) (Amendment) Regulations 2007 (S.I. 2007/2975)
 Enterprise Act 2002 (Part 9 Restrictions on Disclosure of Information) (Amendment and Specification) Order 2007 (S.I. 2007/2977)
 Education (Pupil Referral Units) (Management Committees etc.) (England) Regulations 2007 (S.I. 2007/2978)
 Education (Pupil Referral Units) (Application of Enactments) (England) Regulations 2007 (S.I. 2007/2979)
 Flood Defence (Mimmshall Brook Works) Order 2007 (S.I. 2007/2980)
 Superannuation (Admission to Schedule 1 to the Superannuation Act 1972) Order 2007 (S.I. 2007/2981)
 Motor Vehicles (Compulsory Insurance) (Information Centre and Compensation Body) (Amendment) Regulations 2007 (S.I. 2007/2982)
 Contaminants in Food (England) (Amendment) (No. 2) Regulations 2007 (S.I. 2007/2983)
 Import and Export Restrictions (Foot-and-Mouth Disease) (No. 5) Regulations 2007 (S.I. 2007/2984)
 Bluetongue (Compensation) Order 2007 (S.I. 2007/2996)
 Import and Export Restrictions (Foot-and-Mouth Disease) (No. 5) (Wales) Regulations 2007 (S.I. 2007/2997)
 Pesticides (Maximum Residue Levels in Crops, Food and Feeding Stuffs) (England and Wales) (Amendment) (No. 3) Regulations 2007 (S.I. 2007/2998)
 Civil Aviation (Contributions to the Air Travel Trust) Regulations 2007 (S.I. 2007/2999)
 Income Tax (Benefits Received by Former Owner of Property) (Election for Inheritance Tax Treatment) Regulations 2007 (S.I. 2007/3000)

3001-3100

 Offender Management Act 2007 (Commencement No.1 and Transitional Provisions) Order 2007 (S.I. 2007/3001)
 Bluetongue (Wales) (Amendment) Order 2007 (S.I. 2007/3002)
 Halton (Parishes) Order 2007 (S.I. 2007/3003)
 Cattle Identification (Wales) (Amendment) Regulations 2007 (S.I. 2007/3004)
 General Dental Council (Appointments Committee and Appointment of Members of Committees) (Amendment) Rules Order of Council 2007 (S.I. 2007/3005)
 General Dental Council (Election of Members) (Amendment) Rules Order of Council 2007 (S.I. 2007/3006)
 Feed (Corn Gluten Feed and Brewers Grains) (Emergency Control) (England) (Revocation) Regulations 2007 (S.I. 2007/3007)
 Feed (Specified Undesirable Substances) (England) Regulations 2007 (S.I. 2007/3008)
 Education (Determination of Admission Arrangements) (Amendment No. 2) (England) Regulations 2007 (S.I. 2007/3009)
 Bluetongue (Wales) (Compensation) Order 2007 3010)
 Magistrates' Courts Warrants (Specifications of Provisions) (Amendment) Order 2007 (S.I. 2007/3011)
 Accession (Worker Authorisation and Worker Registration) (Amendment) Regulations 2007 (S.I. 2007/3012)
 Plant Health (Import Inspection Fees) (England) (Amendment) (No. 2) Regulations 2007 (S.I. 2007/3013)
 Occupational Pension Schemes (EEA States) Regulations 2007 (S.I. 2007/3014)
 Pensions Act 2007 (Commencement No. 1) Order 2007 (S.I. 2007/3063)
 Serious Organised Crime and Police Act 2005 (Commencement No. 10) Order 2007 (S.I. 2007/3064)
 Animal Welfare Act 2006 (Commencement No. 2 and Saving and Transitional Provisions) (Wales) Order 2007 (S.I. 2007/3065)
 Maintained Schools (Partnership Agreements) (Wales) Regulations 2007 (S.I. 2007/3066)
 A1(M) Motorway (Junction 58, Junction 60, Junction 61, and Junction 62 Circulatory Carriageways) (Trunking) Order 2007 (S.I. 2007/3067)
 Income Tax (Car Benefits) (Reduction of Value of Appropriate Percentage) (Amendment) Regulations 2007 (S.I. 2007/3068)
 Justice and Security (Northern Ireland) Act 2007 (Commencement No.2) Order 2007 (S.I. 2007/3069)
 Welfare of Farmed Animals (Wales) Regulations 2007 (S.I. 2007/3070)
 Education (School Day and School Year) (England) (Amendment) Regulations 2007 (S.I. 2007/3071)
 Renewable Transport Fuel Obligations Order 2007 (S.I. 2007/3072)
 Police and Justice Act 2006 (Commencement No. 5) Order 2007 (S.I. 2007/3073)
 Education and Inspections Act 2006 (Commencement No.6) Order 2007 (S.I. 2007/3074)
 Merchant Shipping and Fishing Vessels (Control of Noise at Work) Regulations 2007 (S.I. 2007/3075)
 Crime and Disorder (Formulation and Implementation of Strategy) (Wales) Regulations 2007 (S.I. 2007/3076)
 Merchant Shipping and Fishing Vessels (Control of Vibration at Work) Regulations 2007 (S.I. 2007/3077)
 Substance Misuse (Formulation and Implementation of Strategy) (Wales) Regulations 2007 (S.I. 2007/3078)
 Fuel-testing Pilot Projects (Biobutanol Project) Regulations 2007 (S.I. 2007/3098)
 Value Added Tax (Amendment) (No. 7) Regulations 2007 (S.I. 2007/3099)
 Merchant Shipping and Fishing Vessels (Health and Safety at Work) (Carcinogens and Mutagens) Regulations 2007 (S.I. 2007/3100)

3101-3200

 European Qualifications (Health and Social Care Professions) Regulations 2007 (S.I. 2007/3101)
 Asylum Support (Prescribed Period following Appeal) Regulations 2007 (S.I. 2007/3102)
 Tax Avoidance Schemes (Information) (Amendment) (No. 2) Regulations 2007 (S.I. 2007/3103)
 Tax Avoidance Schemes (Penalty) Regulations 2007 (S.I. 2007/3104)
 Agricultural Land Tribunals (Rules) Order 2007 (S.I. 2007/3105)
 Persistent Organic Pollutants Regulations 2007 (S.I. 2007/3106)
 Greater London Authority Act 2007 (Commencement No.1 and Appointed Day) Order 2007 (S.I. 2007/3107)
 Road Vehicles (Construction and Use) (Amendment) (No. 3) Regulations 2007 (S.I. 2007/3132)
 Plant Health (England) (Amendment) (No. 3) Order 2007 (S.I. 2007/3133)
 Nursing and Midwifery Council (Election Scheme) (Amendment) Rules Order of Council 2007 (S.I. 2007/3134)
 Motor Vehicles (EC Type Approval) (Amendment No. 2) Regulations 2007 (S.I. 2007/3135)
 Local Government and Public Involvement in Health Act 2007 (Commencement No. 1 and Savings) Order 2007 (S.I. 2007/3136)
 British Nationality (General and Hong Kong) (Amendment) Regulations 2007 (S.I. 2007/3137)
 Immigration, Asylum and Nationality Act 2006 (Commencement No. 7) Order 2007 (S.I. 2007/3138)
 British Nationality (British Overseas Territories) Regulations 2007 (S.I. 2007/3139)
 Import and Export Restrictions (Foot-and-Mouth Disease) (No. 6) (Wales) Regulations 2007 (S.I. 2007/3140)
 PPP Administration Order Rules 2007 (S.I. 2007/3141)
 Import and Export Restrictions (Foot-and-Mouth Disease) (No. 6) Regulations 2007 (S.I. 2007/3142)
 Community Drivers' Hours and Working Time (Foot-and-Mouth Disease) (Temporary Exception) (Amendment) Regulations 2007 (S.I. 2007/3143)
 York Hospitals NHS Foundation Trust (Transfer of Trust Property) Order 2007 (S.I. 2007/3144)
 Scarborough and North East Yorkshire Health Care National Health Service Trust (Transfer of Trust Property) Order 2007 (S.I. 2007/3145)
 Harrogate and District NHS Foundation Trust (Transfer of Trust Property) Order 2007 (S.I. 2007/3146)
 South Tees Hospitals National Health Service Trust (Transfer of Trust Property) Order 2007 (S.I. 2007/3147)
 Industrial Training (Film Industry Training Board for England and Wales) Order 2007 (S.I. 2007/3148)
 Prison (Amendment No. 2) Rules 2007 (S.I. 2007/3149)
 Bluetongue (Wales) Order 2007 (S.I. 2007/3150)
 Mobile Homes Act 1983 (Amendment of Schedule 1) (Wales) Order 2007 (S.I. 2007/3151)
 Administration Charges (Summary of Rights and Obligations) (Wales) Regulations 2007 (S.I. 2007/3152)
 Rating Lists (Valuation Date) (Wales) Order 2007 (S.I. 2007/3153)
 Bluetongue Order 2007 (S.I. 2007/3154)
 Gambling Act 2005 (Commencement No. 7) Order 2007 (S.I. 2007/3155)
 Stebbing Green (Revocation of Parish Council Byelaws) Order 2007 (S.I. 2007/3156)
 Gambling Act 2005 (Temporary Use Notices) Regulations 2007 (S.I. 2007/3157)
 Air Navigation (Dangerous Goods) (Amendment) (No. 2) Regulations 2007 (S.I. 2007/3159)
 Service Charges (Summary of Rights and Obligations, and Transitional Provisions) (Wales) Regulations 2007 (S.I. 2007/3160)
 Commonhold and Leasehold Reform Act 2002 (Commencement No. 4) (Wales) Order 2007 (S.I. 2007/3161)
 Administration Charges (Summary of Rights and Obligations) (Wales) Regulations 2007 (S.I. 2007/3162)
 Caravan Sites Act 1968 (Amendment) (Wales) Order 2007 (S.I. 2007/3163)
 Mobile Homes (Written Statement) (Wales) Regulations 2007 (S.I. 2007/3164)
 Natural Mineral Water, Spring Water and Bottled Drinking Water (Wales) Regulations 2007 (S.I. 2007/3165)
 Finance Act 2007 (Sections 82 to 84 and Schedule 23) (Commencement) Order 2007 (S.I. 2007/3166)
 Zootechnical Standards (Amendment) (England) Regulations 2007 (S.I. 2007/3167)
 General Medical Council (Fitness to Practise) (Amendments in Relation to Undertakings) Rules Order of Council 2007 (S.I. 2007/3168)
 Community Legal Service (Funding) (Counsel in Family Proceedings) (Amendment No. 2) Order 2007 (S.I. 2007/3169)
 Asylum and Immigration Tribunal (Procedure) (Amendment No. 2) Rules 2007 (S.I. 2007/3170)
 Feed (Specified Undesirable Substances) (Wales) Regulations 2007 (S.I. 2007/3171)
 General Dental Council (Constitution) (Amendment) Order of Council 2007 (S.I. 2007/3172)
 Feed (Corn Gluten Feed and Brewers Grains) (Emergency Control) (Wales) (Revocation) Regulations 2007 (S.I. 2007/3173)
 Traffic Management Act 2004 (Commencement No. 2 and Transitional Provisions) (Wales) Order 2007 (S.I. 2007/3174)
 Police and Criminal Evidence Act 1984 (Application to Revenue and Customs) Order 2007 (S.I. 2007/3175)
 Road Traffic (Permitted Parking Area and Special Parking Area) (County of Hertfordshire) (Borough of Watford) (Amendment) Order 2007 (S.I. 2007/3181)
 Common Agricultural Policy Single Payment and Support Schemes (Amendment) Regulations 2007 (S.I. 2007/3182)
 Social Security (Housing Costs and Miscellaneous Amendments) Regulations 2007 (S.I. 2007/3183)
 Traffic Management Act 2004 (Commencement No.6) (England) Order 2007 (S.I. 2007/3184)
 Official Feed and Food Controls (England) Regulations 2007 (S.I. 2007/3185)
 Corporation Tax (Implementation of the Mergers Directive) Regulations 2007 (S.I. 2007/3186)
 Asylum (Procedures) Regulations 2007 (S.I. 2007/3187)
 Fire and Rescue Services (Emergencies) (Wales) Order 2007 (S.I. 2007/3193)
 District of Newark and Sherwood (Electoral Changes) (Amendment) Order 2007 (S.I. 2007/3200)

3201-3300

 A20 Trunk Road (Dover Eastern Docks Exit Road) Slip Road Order 2007 (S.I. 2007/3201)
 Police Reform Act 2002 (Standard Powers and Duties of Community Support Officers) Order 2007 (S.I. 2007/3202)
 Police and Justice Act 2006 (Commencement No. 6) Order 2007 (S.I. 2007/3203)
 Crouch Harbour Authority (Constitution) Harbour Revision Order 2007 (S.I. 2007/3204)
 Harbour School Order 2007 (S.I. 2007/3205)
 Education (Admissions Appeals Arrangements) (England) (Amendment) Regulations 2007 (S.I. 2007/3206)
 Felixstowe Dock and Railway Harbour Revision Order 2007 (S.I. 2007/3219)
 Young Offender Institution (Amendment No. 2) Rules 2007 (S.I. 2007/3220)
 Secretaries of State for Children, Schools and Families, for Innovation, Universities and Skills and for Business, Enterprise and Regulatory Reform Order 2007 (S.I. 2007/3224)
 Education (Chief Inspector of Education and Training in Wales) (No. 2) Order 2007 (S.I. 2007/3225)
 Education (Chief Inspector of Education and Training in Wales) (No. 3) Order 2007 (S.I. 2007/3226)
 European Communities (Definition of Treaties) (Partnership and Cooperation Agreement) (Republic of Tajikistan) Order 2007 (S.I. 2007/3227)
 Inspectors of Education, Children's Services and Skills (No. 6) Order 2007 (S.I. 2007/3228)
 Licensing and Management of Houses in Multiple Occupation (Additional Provisions) (Wales) Regulations 2007 (S.I. 2007/3229)
 Assembly Learning Grants and Loans (Higher Education) (Wales) (Amendment) (No. 3) Regulations 2007 (S.I. 2007/3230)
 Houses in Multiple Occupation (Certain Blocks of Flats) (Modifications to the Housing Act 2004 and Transitional Provisions for section 257 HMOs) (Wales) Regulations 2007 (S.I. 2007/3231)
 Housing Act 2004 (Commencement No 5) (Wales) Order 2007 (S.I. 2007/3232)
 M25 (Junction 14, Terminal 5 Spur Roads) (Speed Limit) Regulations 2007 (S.I. 2007/3233)
 East Kent Railway Order 2007 (S.I. 2007/3234)
 Housing (Assessment of Accommodation Needs) (Meaning of Gypsies and Travellers) (Wales) Regulations 2007 (S.I. 2007/3235)
 Radioactive Contaminated Land Regulations (Northern Ireland) (Amendment) Regulations 2007 (S.I. 2007/3236)
 Radioactive Contaminated Land (Scotland) (Amendment) Regulations 2007 (S.I. 2007/3240)
 Radioactive Contaminated Land (Modification of Enactments) (England) (Amendment) Regulations 2007 (S.I. 2007/3245)
 Radioactive Contaminated Land (Modification of Enactments) (Wales) (Amendment) Regulations 2007 (S.I. 2007/3250)
 Police and Justice Act 2006 (Commencement No. 1) (Wales) Order 2007 (S.I. 2007/3251)
 Materials and Articles in Contact with Food (Wales) Regulations 2007 (S.I. 2007/3252)
 Reinsurance Directive Regulations 2007 (S.I. 2007/3253)
 Financial Services and Markets Act 2000 (Reinsurance Directive) Order 2007 (S.I. 2007/3254)
 Financial Services and Markets Act 2000 (Reinsurance Directive) Regulations 2007 (S.I. 2007/3255)
 Food Labelling (Declaration of Allergens) (England) Regulations 2007 (S.I. 2007/3256)
 Town and Country Planning (Regions) (New Forest National Park) (England) Order 2007 (S.I. 2007/3276)
 Animals and Animal Products (Import and Export) (England) (Amendment) Regulations 2007 (S.I. 2007/3277)
 Energy-Saving Items (Income Tax) Regulations 2007 (S.I. 2007/3278)
 Animals and Animal Products (Import and Export) (Wales) (Amendment) Regulations 2007 (S.I. 2007/3279)
 National Health Service (Pension Scheme, Injury Benefits, Additional Voluntary Contributions and Compensation for Premature Retirement) Amendment Regulations 2007 (S.I. 2007/3280)
 Medicines (Pharmacies) (Applications for Registration and Fees) Amendment Regulations 2007 (S.I. 2007/3282)
 Police Act 1997 (Criminal Records) (Registration) Regulations (Northern Ireland) 2007 (S.I. 2007/3283)
 Grants for Fishing and Aquaculture Industries Regulations 2007 (S.I. 2007/3284)
 Disability Discrimination Act 2005 (Commencement No. 1) (Wales) Order 2007 (S.I. 2007/3285)
 Charities Act 2006 (Commencement No. 2, Transitional Provisions and Savings) Order 2007 (S.I. 2007/3286)
 Proceeds of Crime Act 2002 (Business in the Regulated Sector and Supervisory Authorities) Order 2007 (S.I. 2007/3287)
 Terrorism Act 2000 (Business in the Regulated Sector and Supervisory Authorities) Order 2007 (S.I. 2007/3288)
 National Health Service (Optical Charges and Payments) Amendment (No. 2) Regulations 2007 (S.I. 2007/3289)
 Immigration (Restrictions on Employment) Order 2007 (S.I. 2007/3290)
 Patents Rules 2007 (S.I. 2007/3291)
 Patents (Fees) Rules 2007 (S.I. 2007/3292)
 Patents (Compulsory Licensing and Supplementary Protection Certificates) Regulations 2007 (S.I. 2007/3293)
 Official Feed and Food Controls (Wales) Regulations 2007 (S.I. 2007/3294)
 Export and Movement Restrictions (Foot-and-Mouth Disease) Regulations 2007 (S.I. 2007/3295)
 Export and Movement Restrictions (Foot-and-Mouth Disease) (Wales) Regulations 2007 (S.I. 2007/3296)
 Pesticides (Maximum Residue Levels in Crops, Food and Feeding Stuffs) (England and Wales) (Amendment) (No. 4) Regulations 2007 (S.I. 2007/3297)
 Transfer of Funds (Information on the Payer) Regulations 2007 (S.I. 2007/3298)
 Money Laundering (Amendment) Regulations 2007 (S.I. 2007/3299). Amended the earlier 2007 Regulations (S.I. 2007/2157)
 Consumer Credit Act 2006 (Commencement No. 3) Order 2007 (S.I. 2007/3300)

3301-3400
 Home Information Pack (Amendment) Regulations 2007 (S.I. 2007/3301)
 Energy Performance of Buildings (Certificates and Inspections) (England and Wales) (Amendment No. 2) Regulations 2007 (S.I. 2007/3302)
 Avian Influenza (H5N1) (Miscellaneous Amendments) Order 2007 (S.I. 2007/3303)
 Bluetongue (No. 2) Order 2007 (S.I. 2007/3304)
 Plant Health (Wales) (Amendment) (No. 2) Order 2007 (S.I. 2007/3305)
 Plant Health (Import Inspection Fees) (Wales) (Amendment) (No.2) Regulations 2007 (S.I. 2007/3306)
 Biofuels and Hydrocarbon Oil Duties (Miscellaneous Amendments) Regulations 2007 (S.I. 2007/3307)
 Housing Act 2004 (Commencement No. 10) (England and Wales) Order 2007 (S.I. 2007/3308)
 Bluetongue (No. 2) (Wales) Order 2007 (S.I. 2007/3309)
 Securitisation Companies (Application of Section 83(1) of the Finance Act 2005: Accounting Standards) Regulations 2007 (S.I. 2007/3338)
 Taxation of Securitisation Companies (Amendment) Regulations 2007 (S.I. 2007/3339)
 Criminal Justice Act 2003 (Commencement No. 18) Order 2007 (S.I. 2007/3340)
 Serious Organised Crime and Police Act 2005 (Commencement No. 11) Order 2007 (S.I. 2007/3341)
 Police Act 1997 (Commencement No. 10) Order 2007 (S.I. 2007/3342)
 Non-Domestic Rating Contributions (Wales) (Amendment) Regulations 2007 (S.I. 2007/3343)
 Education (Student Support) (European Institutions) (Amendment) Regulations 2007 (S.I. 2007/3344)
 Felixstowe Dock and Railway Company (Land Acquisition) Order 2007 (S.I. 2007/3345)
 Armed Forces (Service Complaints Commissioner) Regulations 2007 (S.I. 2007/3352)
 Armed Forces (Redress of Individual Grievances) Regulations 2007 (S.I. 2007/3353)
 Non-Domestic Rating (Unoccupied Property) (Amendment) (Wales) Regulations 2007 (S.I. 2007/3354)
 Contaminants in Food (Wales) (Amendment) Regulations 2007 (S.I. 2007/3368)
 Occupational Pensions (Revaluation) Order 2007 (S.I. 2007/3369)
 Special Immigration Appeals Commission (Procedure) (Amendment No. 2) Rules 2007 (S.I. 2007/3370)
 Clean Neighbourhoods and Environment Act 2005 (Commencement No. 3) (Wales) Order 2007 (S.I. 2007/3371)
 Traffic Management Permit Scheme (England) Regulations 2007 (S.I. 2007/3372)
 Education (Information About Individual Pupils) (England) (Amendment) Regulations 2007 (S.I. 2007/3373)
 Water Supply (Water Quality) Regulations 2001 (Amendment) Regulations 2007 (S.I. 2007/3374)
 Avian Influenza (H5N1) (Miscellaneous Amendments) (Wales) Order 2007 (S.I. 2007/3375)
 Electoral Administration Act 2006 (Commencement No. 5) Order 2007 (S.I. 2007/3376)
 Proscribed Organisations Appeal Commission (Procedure) (Amendment) Rules 2007 (S.I. 2007/3377)
 Designs (International Registrations Designating the European Community) Regulations 2007 (S.I. 2007/3378)
 Food Labelling (Declaration of Allergens) (Wales) Regulations 2007 (S.I. 2007/3379)
 Wireless Telegraphy (Licence Award) (No. 2) Regulations 2007 (S.I. 2007/3380)
 Wireless Telegraphy (Limitation of Number of Spectrum Access Licences) (No. 2) Order 2007 (S.I. 2007/3381)
 Army Terms of Service Regulations 2007 (S.I. 2007/3382)
 Army Act 1955 (Part 1) (Regular Army) Regulations 1992 (Amendment) Regulations 2007 (S.I. 2007/3383)
 Designs (International Registrations Designating the European Community) Regulations 2007 (S.I. 2007/3384)
 Meat (Official Controls Charges) (England) (No. 2) Regulations 2007 (S.I. 2007/3385)
 Railways (Interoperability) (Amendment) Regulations 2007 (S.I. 2007/3386)
 Wireless Telegraphy (Spectrum Trading) (Amendment) (No. 2) Regulations 2007 (S.I. 2007/3387)
 Statistics and Registration Service Act 2007 (Commencement No. 1) Order 2007 (S.I. 2007/3388)
 Wireless Telegraphy (Register) (Amendment) (No. 2) Regulations 2007 (S.I. 2007/3389)
 Supply of Information (Register of Deaths) (Northern Ireland) Regulations 2007 (S.I. 2007/3390)
 Registration of Births, Deaths and Marriages (Amendment) No.2 Regulations 2007 (S.I. 2007/3391)
 Fishery Products (Official Controls Charges) (England) Regulations 2007 (S.I. 2007/3392)
 Non-Domestic Rating Contributions (England) (Amendment) Regulations 2007 (S.I. 2007/3393)
 A435 Trunk Road (Warwickshire and Worcestershire) (Detrunking) Order 2007 (S.I. 2007/3394)
 A446 Trunk Road (Bassetts Pole, Staffordshire to M6 Junction 4, Coleshill, Warwickshire) (Detrunking) Order 2007 (S.I. 2007/3395)
 Patents Act 2004 (Commencement No. 4 and Transitional Provisions) Order 2007 (S.I. 2007/3396)
 Terrorism Act 2000 and Proceeds of Crime Act 2002 (Amendment) Regulations 2007 (S.I. 2007/3398)
 Non-Domestic Rating (Demand Notices) (Wales) (Amendment) Regulations 2007 (S.I. 2007/3399)

3401-3500

 Taxation of Securitisation Companies (Amendment No. 2) Regulations 2007 (S.I. 2007/3401)
 Taxation of Insurance Securitisation Companies Regulations 2007 (S.I. 2007/3402)
 Primary Care Trusts (Establishment and Dissolution) (England) Amendment (No. 3) Order 2007 (S.I. 2007/3403)
 North Tees Primary Care Trust (Change of Name) Order 2007 (S.I. 2007/3417)
 Cheltenham (Parishes) (Amendment) Order 2007 (S.I. 2007/3421)
 East Devon (Parishes) Order 2007 (S.I. 2007/3422)
 National Park Authorities (Wales) (Amendment) Order 2007 (S.I. 2007/3423)
 Finance (No. 2) Act 2005, Section 13 (Corporation Tax Exemption for Scientific Research Organisations) (Appointed Day) Order 2007 (S.I. 2007/3424)
 Real Estate Investment Trusts (Joint Venture Groups) Regulations 2007 (S.I. 2007/3425)
 Scientific Research Organisations Regulations 2007 (S.I. 2007/3426)
 Drinking Milk (Amendment) (England) Regulations 2007 (S.I. 2007/3428)
 Milk and Milk Products (Pupils in Educational Establishments) (England) (Amendment) Regulations 2007 (S.I. 2007/3429)
 Insurance Companies (Taxation of Reinsurance Business) (Corporation Tax Acts) (Amendment) Order 2007 (S.I. 2007/3430)
 Loan Relationships and Derivative Contracts (Disregard and Bringing into Account of Profits and Losses) (Amendment No. 2) Regulations 2007 (S.I. 2007/3431)
 Loan Relationships and Derivative Contracts (Change of Accounting Practice) (Amendment) (No. 2) Regulations 2007 (S.I. 2007/3432)
 Greenhouse Gas Emissions Trading Scheme (Amendment No. 2) Regulations 2007 (S.I. 2007/3433)
 Armed Forces Act 2001 (Commencement No.9) Order 2007 (S.I. 2007/3434)
 Export and Movement Restrictions (Foot-and-Mouth Disease) (No.2) Regulations 2007 (S.I. 2007/3435)
 Education (Provision of Information About Young Children) (England) (Amendment) Regulations 2007 (S.I. 2007/3436)
 Stamp Duty Land Tax (Zero-Carbon Homes Relief) Regulations 2007 (S.I. 2007/3437)
 Controls on Dangerous Substances and Preparations (Amendment) (No. 2) Regulations 2007 (S.I. 2007/3438)
 Veterinary Surgeons and Veterinary Practitioners (Registration) (Amendment) Regulations Order of Council 2007 (S.I. 2007/3439)
 Immigration (Designation of Travel Bans) (Amendment) Order 2007 (S.I. 2007/3440)
 Export and Movement Restrictions (Foot-and-Mouth Disease) (No. 2) (Wales) Regulations 2007 (S.I. 2007/3441)
 Courts-Martial (Army) Rules 2007 (S.I. 2007/3442)
 Courts-Martial (Royal Navy) Rules 2007 (S.I. 2007/3443)
 Courts-Martial (Royal Air Force) Rules 2007 (S.I. 2007/3444)
 Insurance Companies (Overseas Life Assurance Business) (Excluded Business) (Amendment No. 2) Regulations 2007 (S.I. 2007/3445)
 Immigration, Asylum and Nationality Act 2006 (Data Sharing Code of Practice) (Revocation) Order 2007 (S.I. 2007/3447)
 Value Added Tax (Reduced Rate) (No. 2) Order 2007 (S.I. 2007/3448)
 Overseas Life Insurance Companies (Amendment No. 2) Regulations 2007 (S.I. 2007/3449)
 Plant Health (Forestry) (Phytophthora ramorum) (Great Britain) (Amendment) Order 2007 (S.I. 2007/3450)
 Criminal Justice Act 2003 (Commencement No. 18 and Transitional Provisions) Order 2007 (S.I. 2007/3451)
 Cosmetic Products (Safety) (Amendment) (No. 3) Regulations 2007 (S.I. 2007/3452)
 Private Hire Vehicles (London) (Transitional Provisions) (Amendment) Regulations 2007 (S.I. 2007/3453)
 Waste Electrical and Electronic Equipment (Amendment) Regulations 2007 (S.I. 2007/3454)
 Supply of Information (Register of Deaths) Regulations 2007 (S.I. 2007/3460)
 Meat (Official Controls Charges) (Wales) (No. 2) Regulations 2007 (S.I. 2007/3461)
 Fishery Products (Official Controls Charges) (Wales) Regulations 2007 (S.I. 2007/3462)
 Maryport Harbour Revision Order 2007 (S.I. 2007/3463)
 School Organisation and Governance (Amendment) (England) Regulations 2007 (S.I. 2007/3464)
 Double Taxation Relief (Taxes on Income) (Switzerland) Order 2007 (S.I. 2007/3465)
 Public Records (Technology Strategy Board) Order 2007 (S.I. 2007/3466)
 Air Navigation (Amendment) (No. 2) Order 2007 (S.I. 2007/3467)
 Air Navigation (Overseas Territories) Order 2007 (S.I. 2007/3468)
 Double Taxation Relief and International Tax Enforcement (Taxes on Income and Capital) (Faroes) Order 2007 (S.I. 2007/3469)
 Parliamentary Commissioner Order 2007 (S.I. 2007/3470)
 European Communities (Designation) (No. 5) Order 2007 (S.I. 2007/3471)
 Digital Switchover (Disclosure of Information) (Isle of Man) Order 2007 (S.I. 2007/3472)
 Salisbury College (Dissolution) Order 2007 (S.I. 2007/3473)
 Fire and Rescue Services (Appointment of Inspector) Order 2007 (S.I. 2007/3474)
 School Organisation (Removal of Foundation, Reduction in Number of Foundation Governors and Ability of Foundation to Pay Debts) (England) Regulations 2007 (S.I. 2007/3475)
 Waste and Air Pollution (Miscellaneous Amendments) Regulations 2007 (S.I. 2007/3476)
 Private Hire Vehicles (Carriage of Guide Dogs etc.) Act 2002 (Commencement No. 1) (Northern Ireland) Order 2007 (S.I. 2007/3477)
 Films (Certification) (Amendment) Regulations 2007 (S.I. 2007/3478)
 Energy Act 2004 (Designation of Publicly Owned Companies) Order 2007 (S.I. 2007/3479)
 Criminal Proceedings etc. (Reform) (Scotland) Act 2007 (Powers of District and JP Courts) Order 2007 (S.I. 2007/3480)
 Income Tax (Indexation) (No. 2) Order 2007 (S.I. 2007/3481)
 Civil Enforcement of Parking Contraventions (England) Representations and Appeals Regulations S.I. 2007/2007)
 Civil Enforcement of Parking Contraventions (England) General Regulations 2007 (S.I. 2007/3483)
 Removal and Disposal of Vehicles (Amendment) (England) Regulations 2007 (S.I. 2007/3484)
 Civil Enforcement Officers (Wearing of Uniforms) (England) Regulations 2007 (S.I. 2007/3485)
 Civil Enforcement of Parking Contraventions (Approved Devices) (England) Order 2007 (S.I. 2007/3486)
 Civil Enforcement of Parking Contraventions (Guidelines on Levels of Charges) (England) Order 2007 (S.I. 2007/3487)
 Damages for Bereavement (Variation of Sum) (Northern Ireland) Order 2007 (S.I. 2007/3488)
 Damages for Bereavement (Variation of Sum) (England and Wales) Order 2007 (S.I. 2007/3489)
 Childcare Act 2006 (Provision of Information to Parents) (England) Regulations 2007 (S.I. 2007/3490)
 National Health Service (Primary Medical Services) (Miscellaneous Amendments) Regulations 2007 (S.I. 2007/3491)
 Road Safety Act 2006 (Commencement No. 2)(England and Wales) Order 2007 (S.I. 2007/3492)
 Sheep and Goats (Records, Identification and Movement) (England) Order 2007 (S.I. 2007/3493)
 Statutory Auditors and Third Country Auditors Regulations 2007 (S.I. 2007/3494)
 Companies Act 2006 (Commencement No. 5, Transitional Provisions and Savings) Order 2007 (S.I. 2007/3495)
 Severn Bridges Tolls Order 2007 (S.I. 2007/3496)

3501-3600

 Further Education and Training Act 2007 (Commencement No. 1 and Transitional Provisions) Order 2007 (S.I. 2007/3505)
 Income Tax Act 2007 (Amendment) (No. 3) Order 2007 (S.I. 2007/3506)
 Recovery of Foreign Taxes Regulations 2007 (S.I. 2007/3507)
 Recovery of Duties and Taxes Etc. Due in Other Member States (Corresponding UK Claims, Procedure and Supplementary) (Amendment) Regulations 2007 (S.I. 2007/3508)
 Financial Services and Markets Act 2000 (Regulated Activities) (Amendment) (No. 2) Order 2007 (S.I. 2007/3510)
 Pensions Act 2007 (Commencement No. 2) Order 2007 (S.I. 2007/3512)
 Export Restrictions (Foot-and-Mouth Disease) Regulations 2007 (S.I. 2007/3513)
 Land Registration (Proper Office) Order 2007 (S.I. 2007/3517)
 Export Restrictions (Foot-and-Mouth Disease) (Wales) Regulations 2007 (S.I. 2007/3518)
 Mid Kent Water and South East Water (Amendment of Local Enactments and Supplemental Provisions) Order 2007 (S.I. 2007/3520)
 Infant Formula and Follow-on Formula (England) Regulations 2007 (S.I. 2007/3521)
 Channel Tunnel (Safety) Order 2007 (S.I. 2007/3531)
 Registered Pension Schemes (Authorised Member Payments) Regulations 2007 (S.I. 2007/3532)
 Registered Pension Schemes (Meaning of Pension Commencement Lump Sum) (Amendment) Regulations 2007 (S.I. 2007/3533)
 Independent Supervisor Appointment Order 2007 (S.I. 2007/3534)
 Companies (Fees for Inspection and Copying of Company Records) (No. 2) Regulations 2007 (S.I. 2007/3535)
 Real Estate Investment Trusts (Financial Statements of Group Real Estate Investment Trusts) (Amendment) Regulations 2007 (S.I. 2007/3536)
 Employer-Financed Retirement Benefits (Excluded Benefits for Tax Purposes) Regulations 2007 (S.I. 2007/3537)
 Environmental Permitting (England and Wales) Regulations 2007 (S.I. 2007/3538)
 Gambling Act 2005 (Premises Licences) (Review) (Amendment) Regulations 2007 (S.I. 2007/3539)
 Real Estate Investment Trusts (Breach of Conditions) (Amendment) Regulations 2007 (S.I. 2007/3540)
 Greater London Authority Elections Rules 2007 (S.I. 20073541)
 Public Contracts and Utilities Contracts (Amendment) Regulations 2007 (S.I. 2007/3542)
 Civil Procedure (Amendment No.2) Rules 2007 (S.I. 2007/3543)
 Legislative and Regulatory Reform (Regulatory Functions) Order 2007 (S.I. 2007/3544)
 Safeguarding Vulnerable Groups Act 2006 (Commencement No. 1) Order 2007 (S.I. 2007/3545)
 Consumers, Estate Agents and Redress Act 2007 (Commencement No. 2) Order 2007 (S.I. 2007/3546)
 Legislative and Regulatory Reform Code of Practice (Appointed Day) Order 2007 (S.I. 2007/3548)
 All Saints Catholic Primary School, Bootle (Designation as having a Religious Character) Order 2007 (S.I. 2007/3549)
 Criminal Defence Service (General) (No. 2) (Amendment No. 3) Regulations 2007 (S.I. 2007/3550)
 Holy Rood Catholic Primary School (Designation as having a Religious Character) Order 2007 (S.I. 2007/3551)
 Criminal Defence Service (Funding) (Amendment) Order 2007 (S.I. 2007/3552)
 Road Traffic (Permitted Parking Area and Special Parking Area) (Royal Borough of Windsor and Maidenhead) Order 2007 (S.I. 2007/3553)
 Bus Lane Contraventions (Approved Local Authorities) (England) (Amendment) (No. 8) Order 2007 (S.I. 2007/3554)
 Equality Act 2006 (Dissolution of Commissions and Consequential and Transitional Provisions) (Amendment) Order 2007 (S.I. 2007/3555)
 Civil Aviation (Allocation of Scarce Capacity) Regulations 2007 (S.I. 2007/3556)
 Holy Trinity CE VC Primary School & Nursery Unit (Designation as having a Religious Character) Order 2007 (S.I. 2007/3557)
 Knaresborough St John's CofE Primary School (Designation as having a Religious Character) Order 2007 (S.I. 2007/3558)
 Offshore Installations (Safety Zones) (No. 7) Order 2007 (S.I. 2007/3559)
 Lulworth and Winfrith CE VC First School (Designation as having a Religious Character) Order 2007 (S.I. 2007/3560)
 Madani Muslim High School (VA) (Designation as having a Religious Character) Order 2007 (S.I. 2007/3561)
 Education (School Performance Information) (Wales) (Amendment) Regulations 2007 (S.I. 2007/3564)
 Road Traffic (Permitted Parking Area and Special Parking Area) (County of Cheshire) (Borough of Crewe and Nantwich) Order 2007 (S.I. 2007/3566)
 Manchester Mesivta School (Designation as having a Religious Character) Order 2007 (S.I. 2007/3567)
 Slough Islamic School (Designation as having a Religious Character) Order 2007 (S.I. 2007/3568)
 St Joseph's Catholic and Church of England Primary School (Designation as having a Religious Character) Order 2007 (S.I. 2007/3569)
 Employment Rights (Increase of Limits) Order 2007 (S.I. 2007/3570)
 St Peter's CE Primary School (Designation as having a Religious Character) Order 2007 (S.I. 2007/3571)
 Stanwell Fields C of E Primary School (Designation as having a Religious Character) Order 2007 (S.I. 2007/3572)
 Infant Formula and Follow-on Formula (Wales) Regulations 2007 (S.I. 2007/3573)
 Control of Salmonella in Poultry Order 2007 (S.I. 2007/3574)
 Conduct of Employment Agencies and Employment Businesses (Amendment) Regulations 2007 (S.I. 2007/3575)
 Maidstone (Parishes) Order 2007 (S.I. 2007/3576)
 Tewkesbury (Parishes) Order 2007 (S.I. 2007/3577)
 Ellesmere Port and Neston (Parish) Order 2007 (S.I. 2007/3578)
 Channel Tunnel (International Arrangements and Miscellaneous Provisions) (Amendment) Order 2007 (S.I. 2007/3579)
 Immigration, Asylum and Nationality Act 2006 (Commencement No. 7) (Amendment) Order 2007 (S.I. 2007/3580)
 Financial Assistance Scheme (Miscellaneous Amendments) Regulations 2007 (S.I. 2007/3581)
 Solicitors (Disciplinary Proceedings) Rules 2007 (S.I. 2007/3588)

3601-3700

 A46 Trunk Road (A46/M40 Junction 15 (Longbridge) Bypass) (Detrunking) Order 2007 (S.I. 2007/3609)
 A46 Trunk Road (A46/M40 Junction 15 (Longbridge) Bypass) Order 2007 (S.I. 2007/3610)
 Education Act 2002 (Commencement No. 11 and Transitional and Savings Provisions) (Wales) Order 2007 (S.I. 2007/3611)
 General Commissioners and Special Commissioners (Jurisdiction and Procedure) (Amendment) Regulations 2007 (S.I. 2007/3612)
 Tribunals, Courts and Enforcement Act 2007 (Commencement No. 2) Order 2007 (S.I. 2007/3613)
 Compulsory Purchase (Inquiries Procedure) Rules 2007 (S.I. 2007/3617)
 European Regional Development Fund (West Midlands Operational Programme) (Implementation) Regulations 2007 (S.I. 2007/3618)
 European Regional Development Fund (Yorkshire and the Humber Operational Programme) (Implementation) Regulations 2007 (S.I. 2007/3619)
 European Regional Development Fund (South East Operational Programme) (Implementation) Regulations 2007 (S.I. 2007/3620)
 European Regional Development Fund (North East Operational Programme) (Implementation) Regulations 2007 (S.I. 2007/3621)
 European Regional Development Fund (North West Operational Programme) (Implementation) Regulations 2007 (S.I. 2007/3622)
 European Regional Development Fund (South West Operational Programmes) (Implementation) Regulations 2007 (S.I. 2007/3623)
 European Regional Development Fund (East of England Operational Programme) (Implementation) Regulations 2007 (S.I. 2007/3624)
 European Regional Development Fund (East Midlands Operational Programme) (Implementation) Regulations 2007 (S.I. 2007/3625)
 Criminal Procedure (Amendment No. 3) Rules 2007 (S.I. 2007/3662)

External links
Legislation.gov.uk delivered by the UK National Archive
UK SI's on legislation.gov.uk
UK Draft SI's on legislation.gov.uk

See also
List of Statutory Instruments of the United Kingdom

Lists of Statutory Instruments of the United Kingdom
Statutory Instruments